= 1988 Pacific typhoon season =

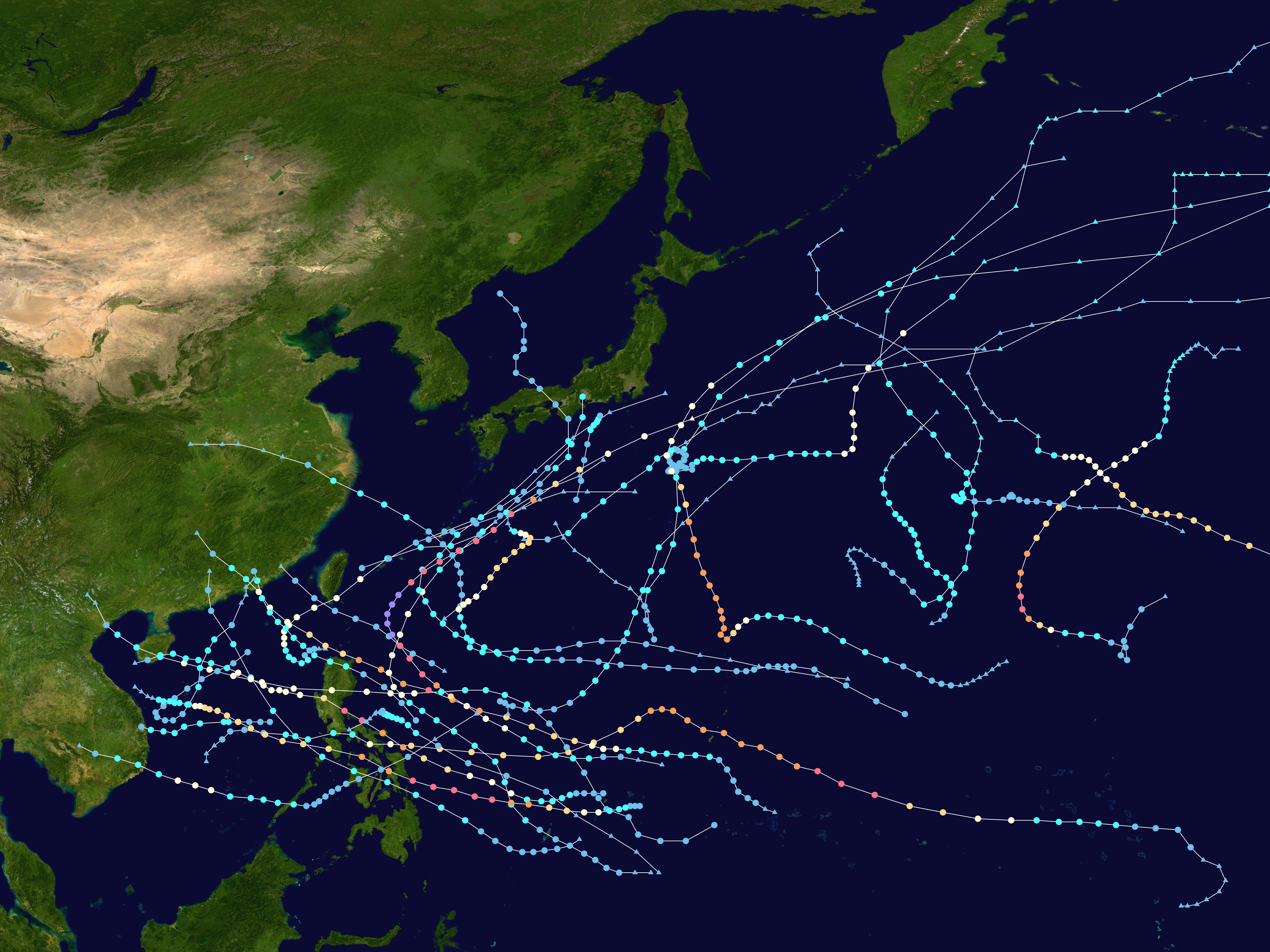
- Season summary map

Seasonal boundaries
- First system formed: January 7, 1988
- Last system dissipated: December 27, 1988

Strongest storm
- Name: Nelson
  - Maximum winds: 185 km/h (115 mph) (10-minute sustained)
  - Lowest pressure: 915 hPa (mbar)

Seasonal statistics
- Total depressions: 52 official, 1 unofficial
- Total storms: 31 official, 1 unofficial
- Typhoons: 11
- Very strong typhoons: 6
- Violent typhoons: 0
- Total fatalities: >801
- Total damage: ≥ $503.9 million (1988 USD)

Related articles
- 1988 Atlantic hurricane season; 1988 Pacific hurricane season; 1988 North Indian Ocean cyclone season

The 1988 Pacific typhoon season was a very active season in terms of named storms, though it only featured 11 typhoons and 1 super typhoon. It had no official bounds; it ran year-round in 1988, but most tropical cyclones formed between May and November. Tropical storms that formed in the entire west Pacific basin were assigned a name by the Joint Typhoon Warning Center. Tropical depressions that enter or form in the Philippine area of responsibility are assigned a name by the Philippine Atmospheric, Geophysical and Astronomical Services Administration or PAGASA. This can often result in the same storm having two names.

A total of 26 tropical cyclones formed this year in the Western Pacific, of which all became tropical storms. Of the 26, 10 storms reached typhoon intensity, of which 1 reached supertyphoon strength. Nine tropical cyclones moved through the Philippines this season, making this season the most active for the archipelago so far this decade.

== Seasonal summary ==
A total of 26 tropical cyclones formed this year in the Western Pacific, of which all became tropical storms. Of the 26, 10 storms reached typhoon intensity, of which 1 reached supertyphoon strength. Nine tropical cyclones moved through the Philippines this season.

== Systems ==
=== Typhoon Roy (Asiang) ===
- Very strong typhoon (JMA)
- Category 4 typhoon (SSHWS)
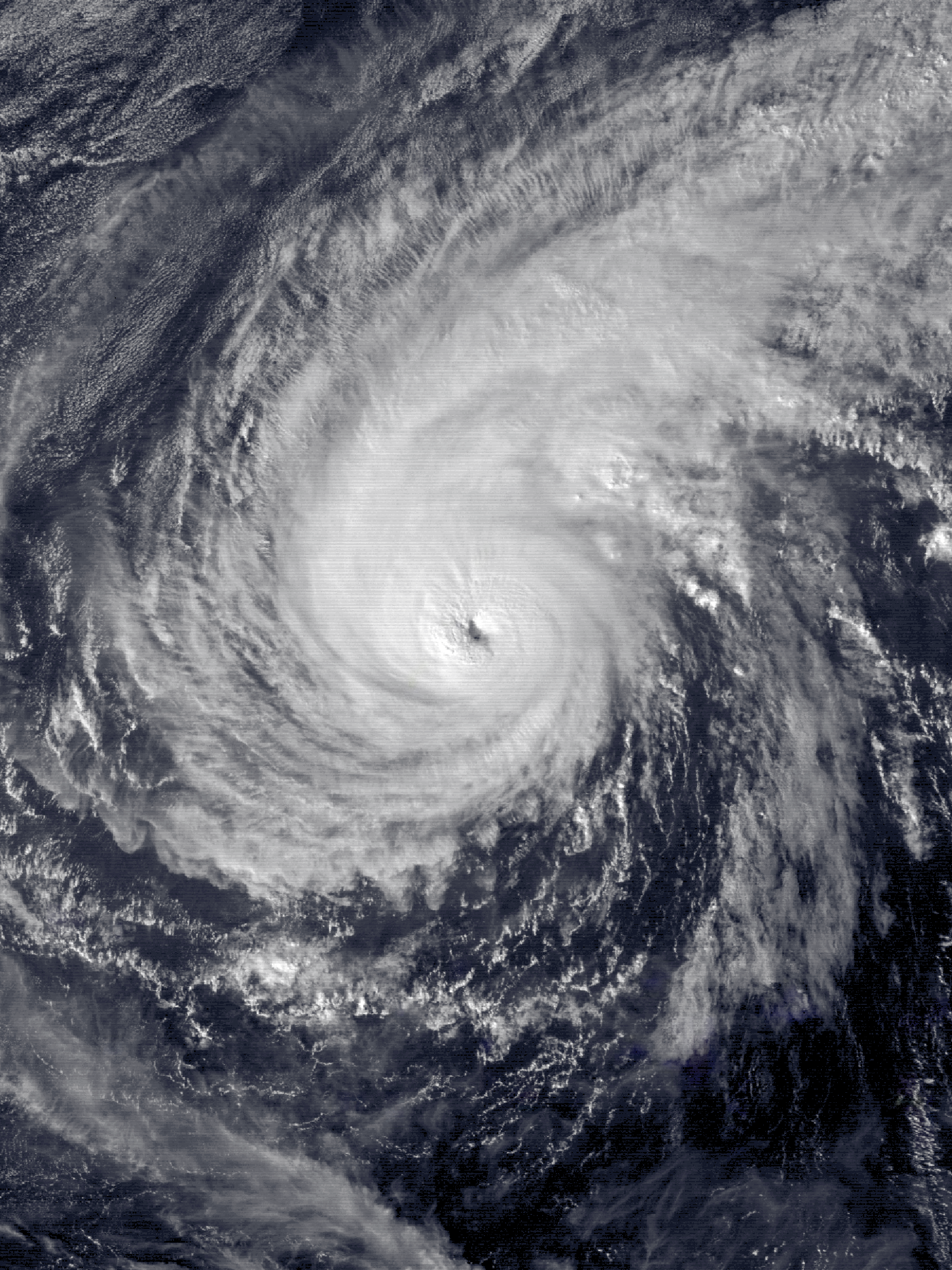
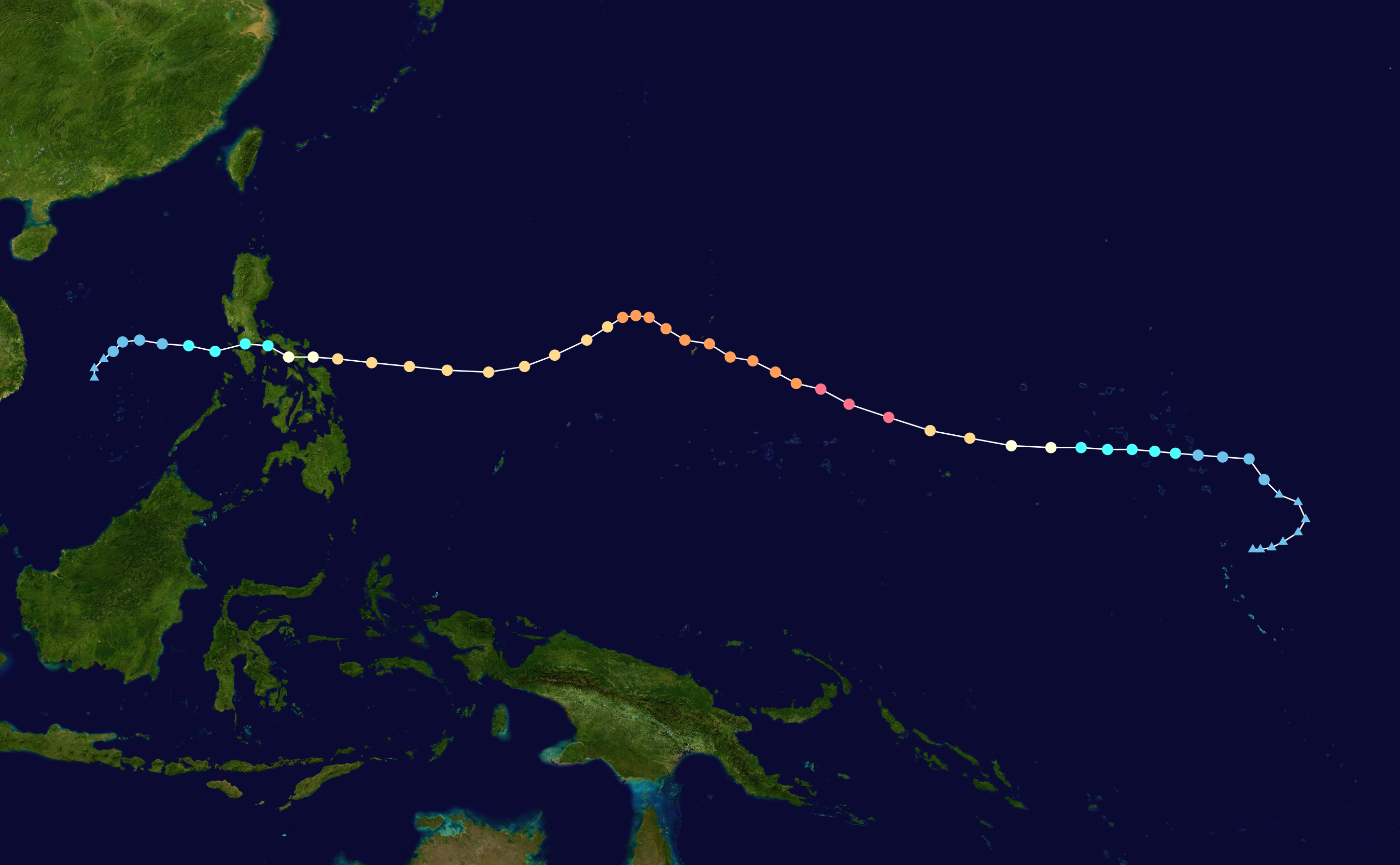
- Duration: January 7 – January 19
- Peak intensity: 155 km/h (100 mph) (10-min); 940 hPa (mbar)

Typhoon Roy, which crossed the open Western Pacific as a Category 4 typhoon in January, caused moderate to extensive damage across the Federated States of Micronesia and the Philippines, causing $23.5 million (1988 USD) but only one death. (Note: All damage totals are in 1988 values of their respective currencies.)

=== Typhoon Susan (Biring) ===
- Typhoon (JMA)
- Category 1 typhoon (SSHWS)
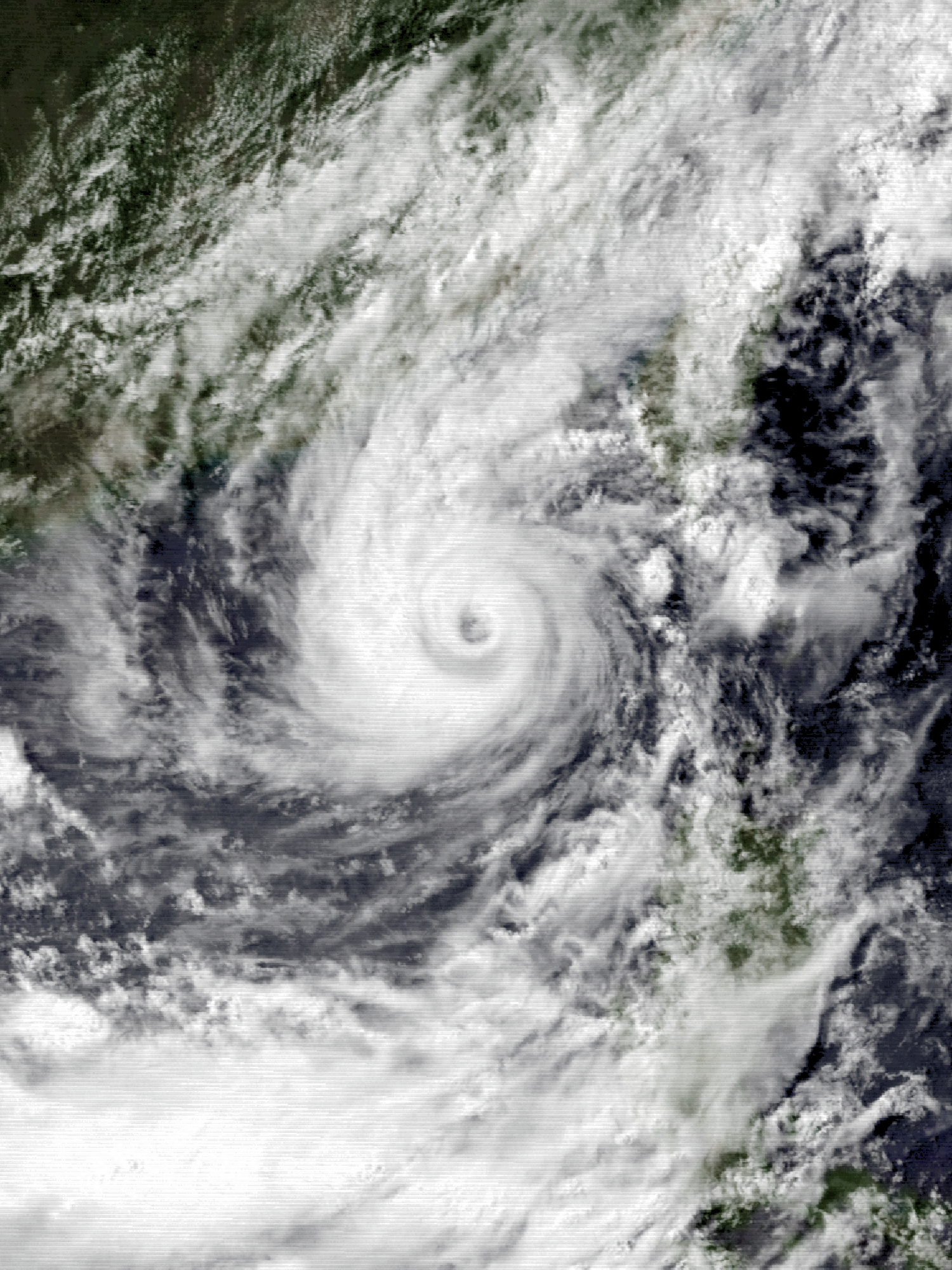
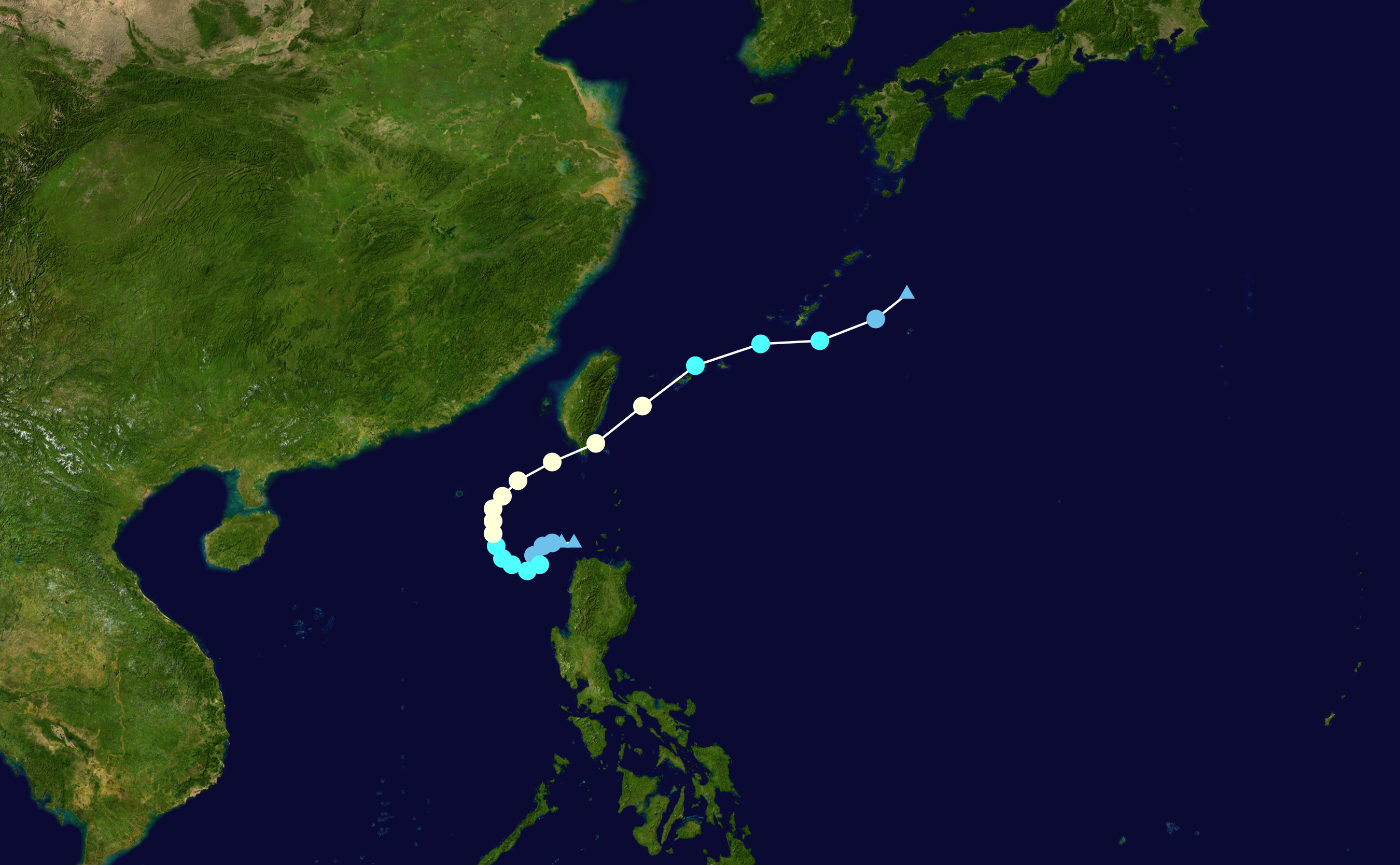
- Duration: May 28 – June 3
- Peak intensity: 120 km/h (75 mph) (10-min); 970 hPa (mbar)

Typhoon Susan formed at the end of May just to the north of Luzon Island in the Philippines. As a depression Susan dropped heavy rains in and around the Manila area the resulting landslides killed 36 people. Losses totaled to US$1 million. As Susan moved away from the Philippines the storm strengthened into a typhoon shortly before cross in the southern tip of Taiwan and turning extratropical just after passing Okinawa. Heavy rains triggered landslides in Taiwan that blocked roads and caused the loss of crops. Numerous power outages were reported. Damage in Taiwan was at US$4.5 million.

=== Tropical Storm 03W (Konsing) ===
- Tropical storm (JMA)
- Tropical depression (SSHWS)
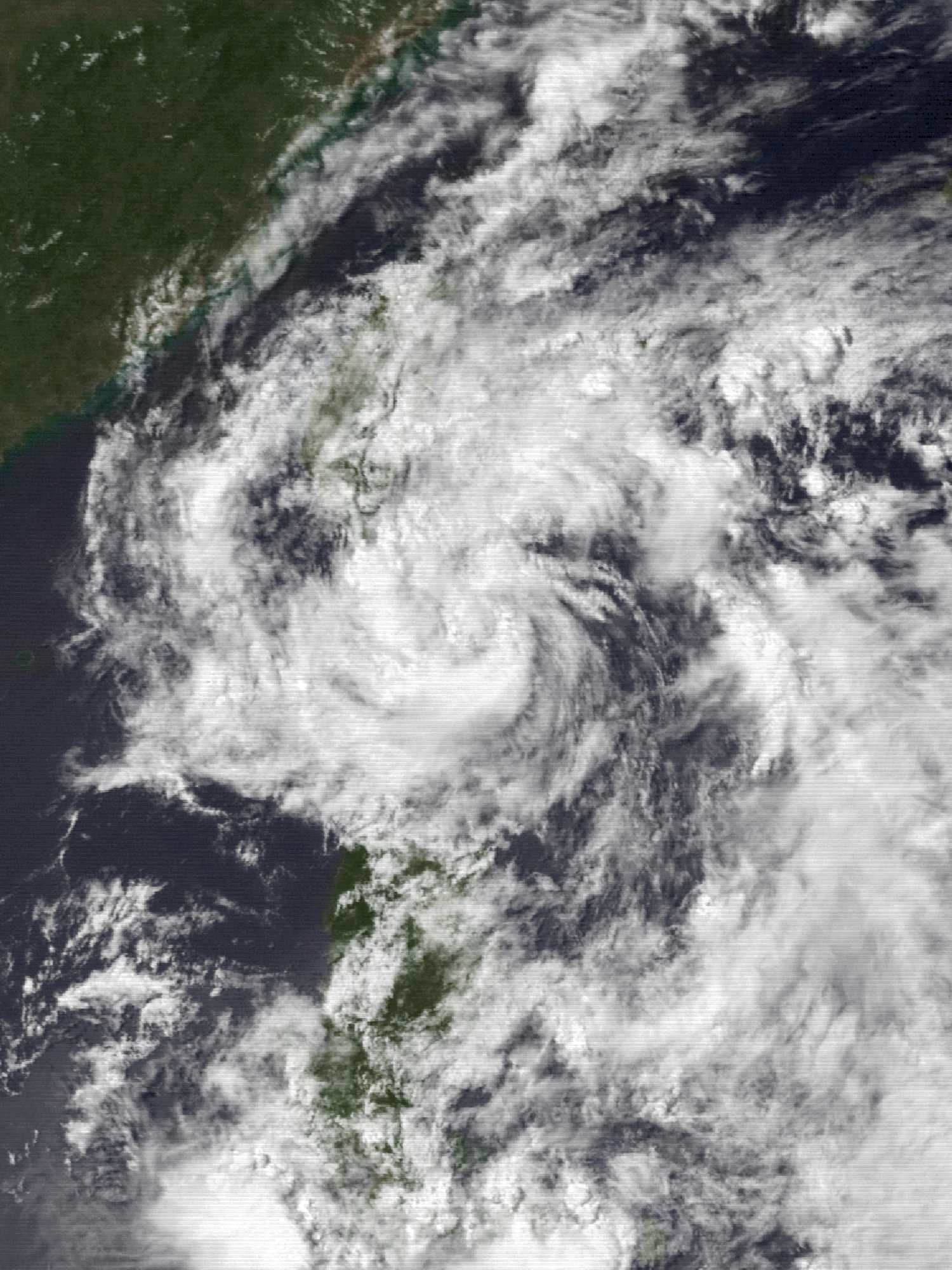
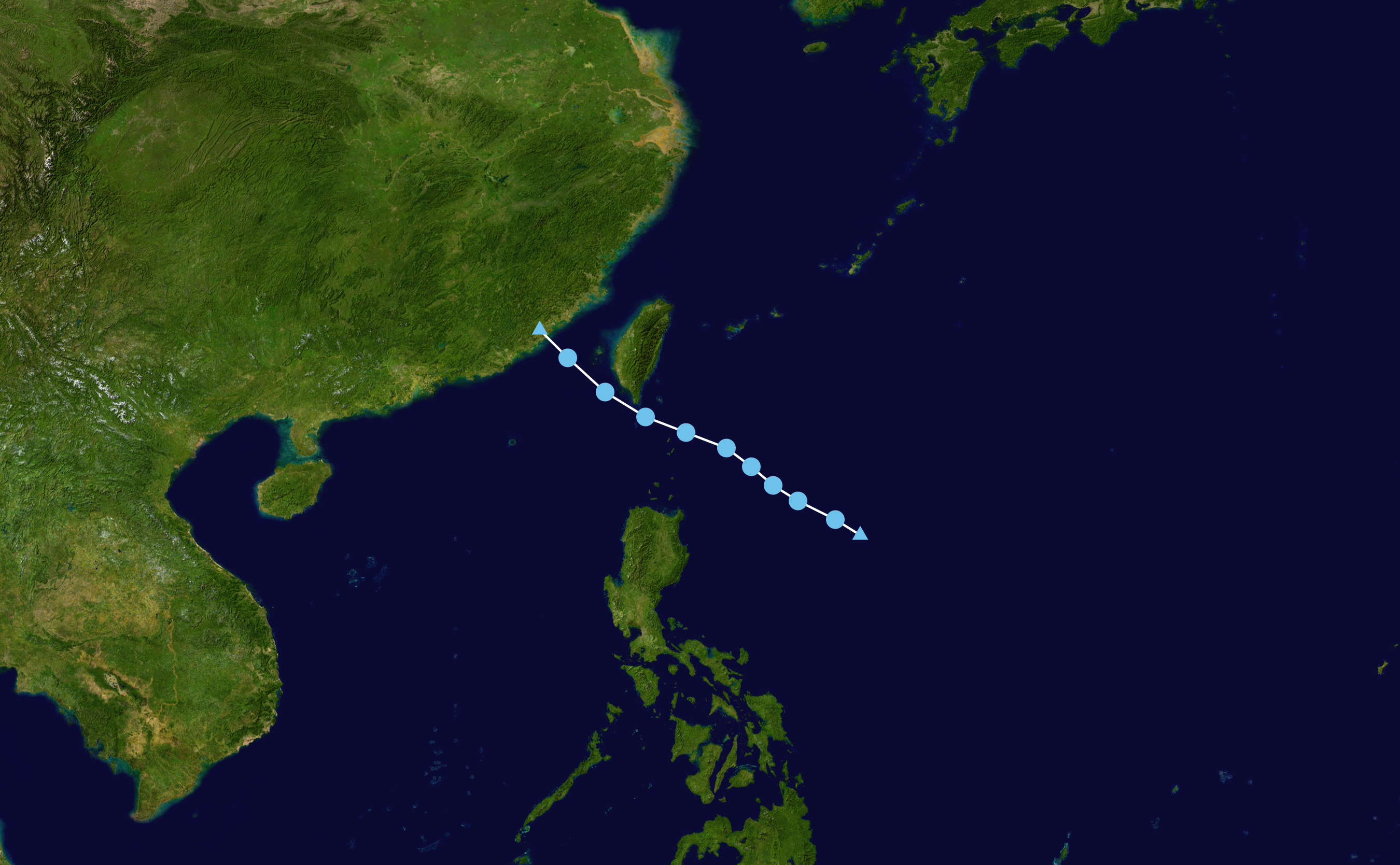
- Duration: June 3 – June 6
- Peak intensity: 65 km/h (40 mph) (10-min); 1000 hPa (mbar)

An area of convection developed on June 3 in the western Philippine Sea. The disturbance was designated Tropical Depression 03W as it tracked northwestward. It reached a peak intensity of 35 mph (45 km/h) before its central convection collapsed later that day. The system dissipated on the 6th as it tracked towards Taiwan and China.

=== Typhoon Thad (Ditang) ===
- Typhoon (JMA)
- Category 1 typhoon (SSHWS)
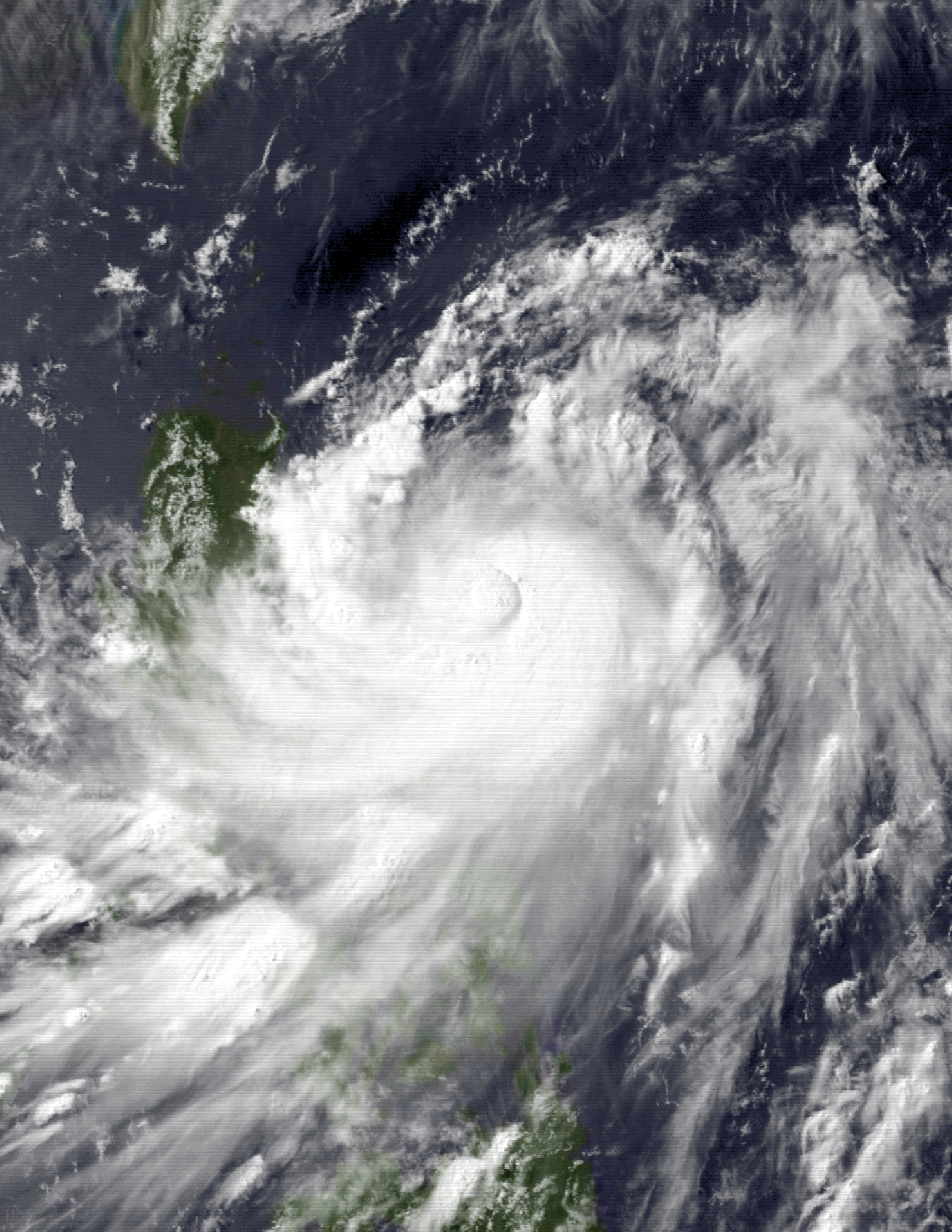
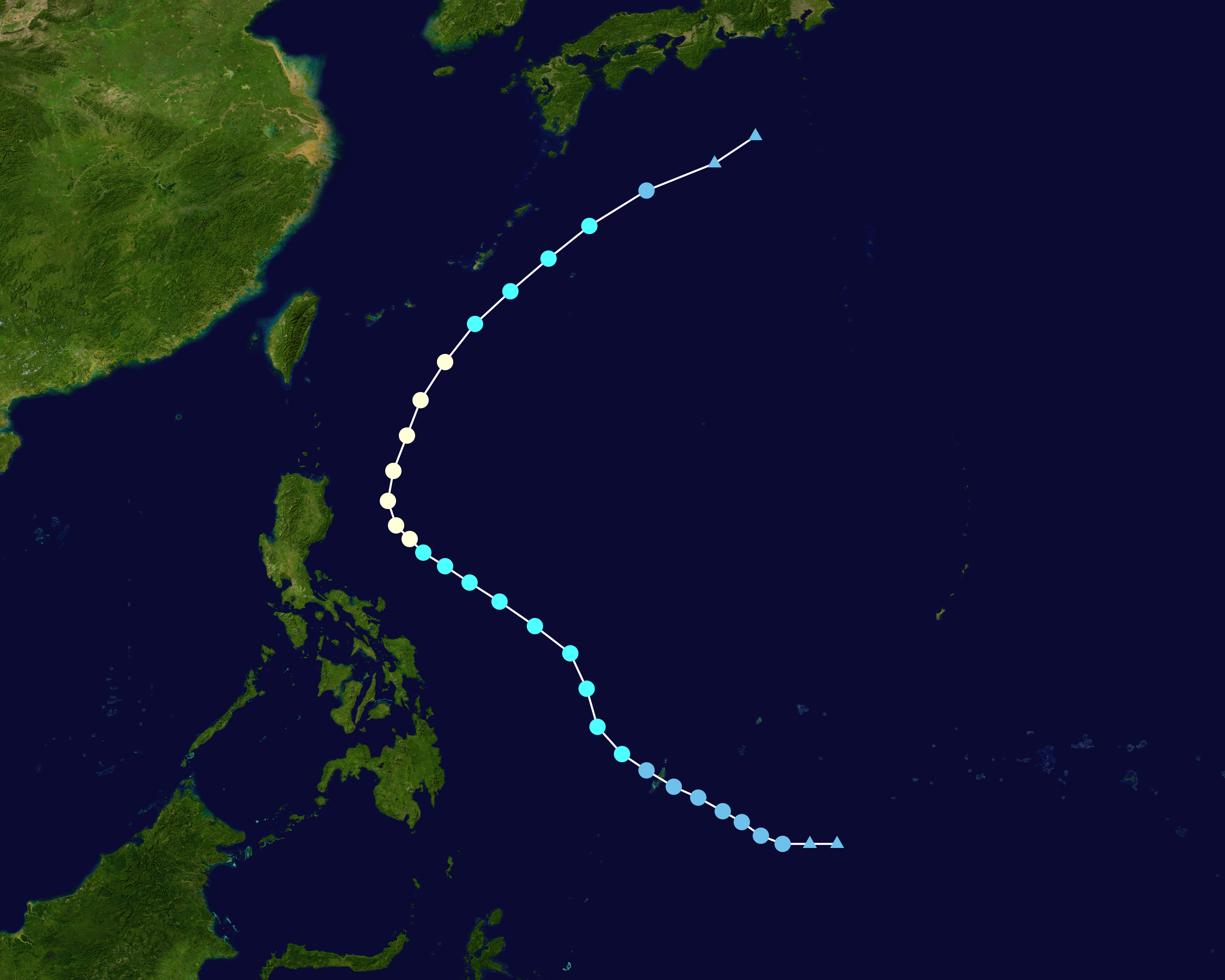
- Duration: June 17 – June 25
- Peak intensity: 130 km/h (80 mph) (10-min); 970 hPa (mbar)

A tropical depression was designated by the JMA early on June 18. At the time, the depression was located south of the Caroline Islands. Further development was slow to occur due to strong winds aloft caused by a TUTT. Nevertheless, the system's cloud structure and outflow pattern slowly improved, and based on Dvorak estimates of T2.5/40 mph (65 km/h), the JTWC upgraded the disturbance into Tropical Storm Thad at 00:00 UTC on June 20, with the JMA following suit six hours later. After initially moving west, Thad tracked northwest due to the subtropical ridge to its north. Thad slowly deepened, with the JMA upgrading Thad to a severe tropical storm at 06:00 UTC on June 21 and a typhoon the next day. At 06:00 UTC on June 22, the JTWC upped Thad into a typhoon, based on satellite intensity estimates of 130 km/h (80 mph). Shortly thereafter, the JMA reported that Thad reached its highest intensity, with winds of 130 km/h (80 mph). Additional strengthening did not occur, however, as the system developed a central cold over – a large irregular shaped area of deep convection. By June 23, Thad reached the western periphery of a subtropical ridge, and began to recurve in response to a mid-latitude trough over eastern China. Rapid weakening began at 00:00 UTC on June 24 due to increased winds aloft. Both the JTWC and JMA downgraded Thad into a tropical storm that day as the storm passed 150 km (95 mi) southeast of Okinawa. The JTWC reported that Thad dissipated at 00:00 UTC on June 25, although the JMA continued to track it as a tropical depression for 12 more hours.

=== Severe Tropical Storm Vanessa (Edeng) ===
- Severe tropical storm (JMA)
- Tropical storm (SSHWS)
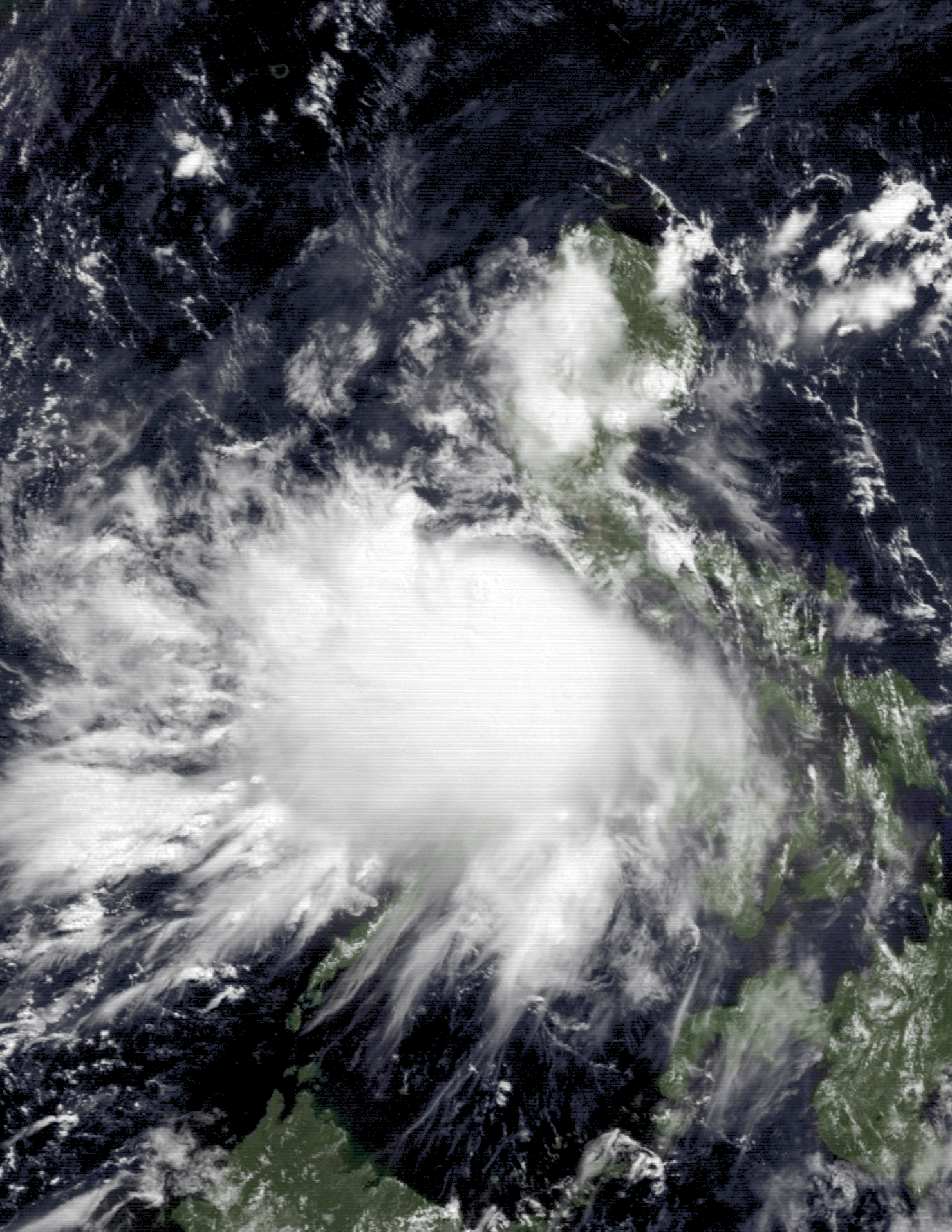
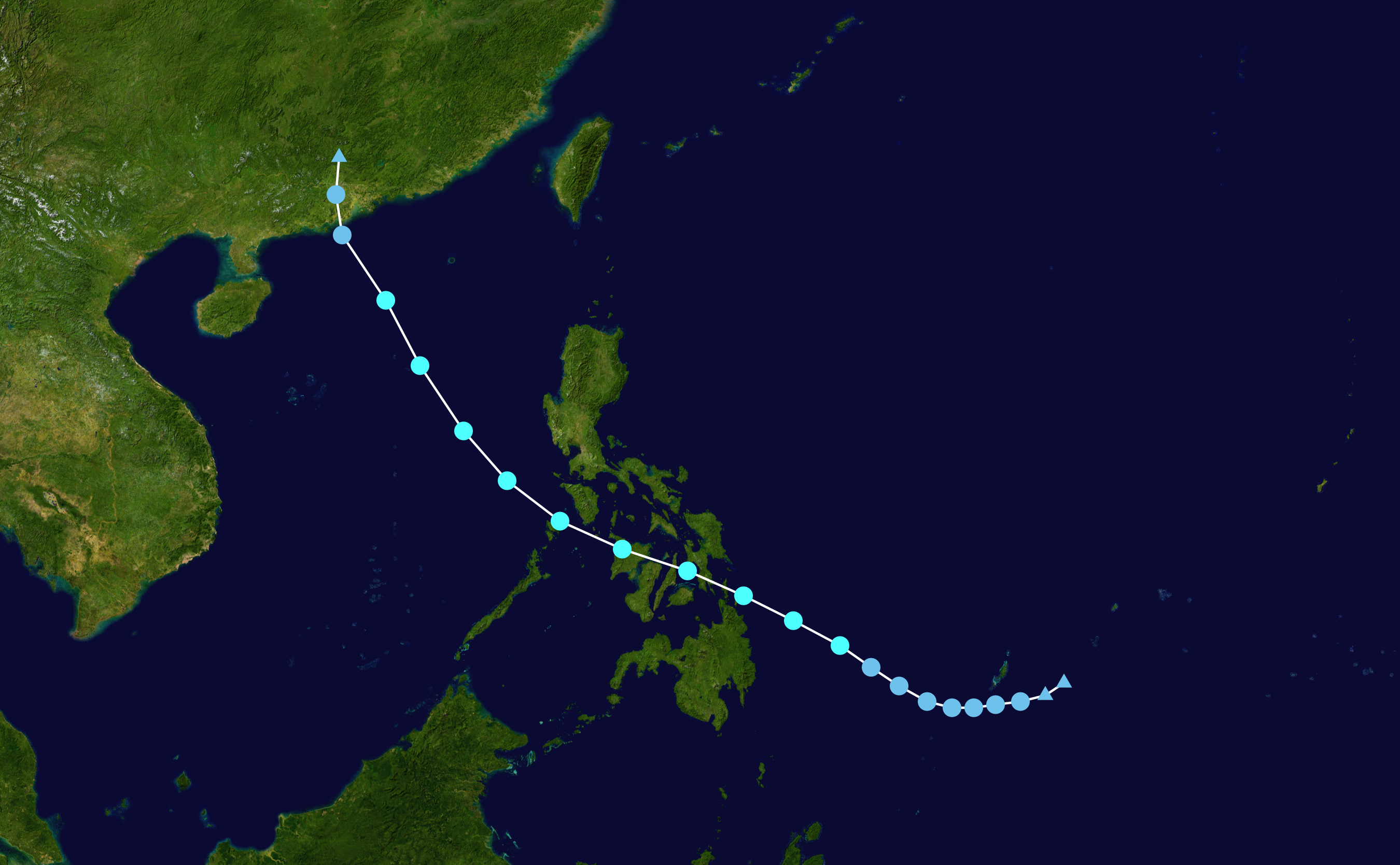
- Duration: June 25 – June 29
- Peak intensity: 100 km/h (65 mph) (10-min); 990 hPa (mbar)

A tropical disturbance was first spotted at noon on June 24 over 200 km (125 mi) east of the Caroline Islands. Thunderstorm activity increased almost immediately thereafter, and the storm's outflow subsequently expanded, aided by a retreating Tropical Upper Tropospheric Trough (TUTT). The JMA upgraded the system into a tropical depression on the morning of June 26. Six hours later, the JTWC followed suit, and at 00:00 UTc on June 27, both the JTWC and JMA upgraded the depression into a tropical storm. Several hours later, Vanessa made landfall over the central Philippines; at the time of landfall, both the JMA and JTWC estimated winds of 80 km/h (50 mph). Accelerating, Vanessa entered the South China Sea at 02:00 UTC on June 28. Around this time, the JMA estimated that Vanessa reached its maximum intensity, with winds of 105 km/h (65 mph), making it a severe tropical storm. Strong wind shear then increased over the system, but Vanessa did not begin weakening until 00:00 UTC on June 29. Six hours later, after Vanessa became devoid of deep convection near the center, the JTWC issued their last warning on the system. However, the JMA continued to track it until noon that day.

=== Typhoon Warren (Huaning) ===
- Very strong typhoon (JMA)
- Category 4 typhoon (SSHWS)
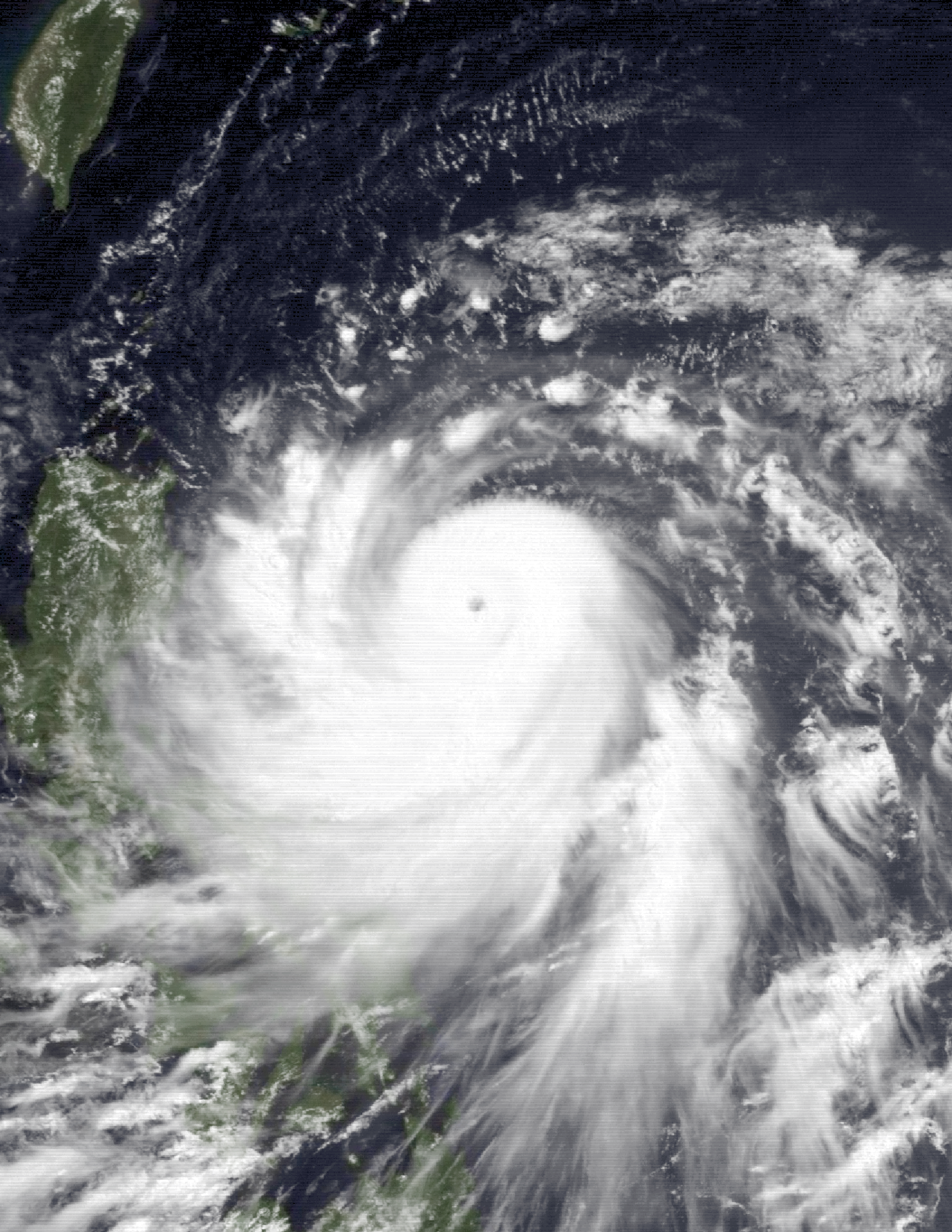
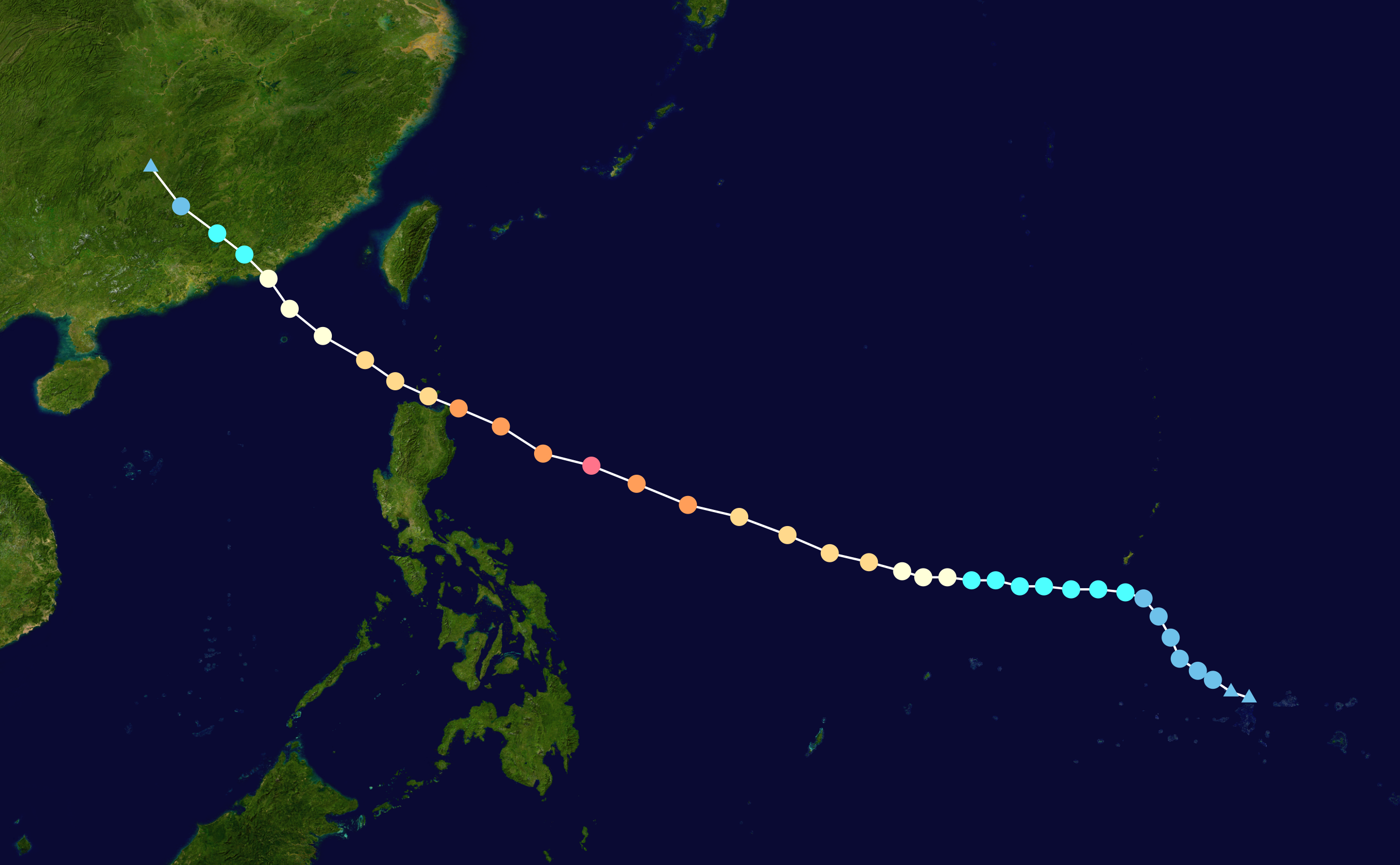
- Duration: July 11 – July 20
- Peak intensity: 165 km/h (105 mph) (10-min); 940 hPa (mbar)

A tropical depression formed to the east of Guam shortly before passing north of the island. Shortly after passing the island the storm strengthened into Tropical Storm Warren. Warren kept gathering strength and reached peak intensity of 130 mph while 300 miles east of Luzon Island. Typhoon Warren moved westward and brushed the extreme northern tip of Luzon Island in the Philippines causing $10 million in damage. Warren then made landfall near Shantou, China, 13,000 homes were destroyed and 17 people were killed in Guangdong Province.

=== Severe Tropical Storm Agnes ===
- Severe tropical storm (JMA)
- Tropical storm (SSHWS)
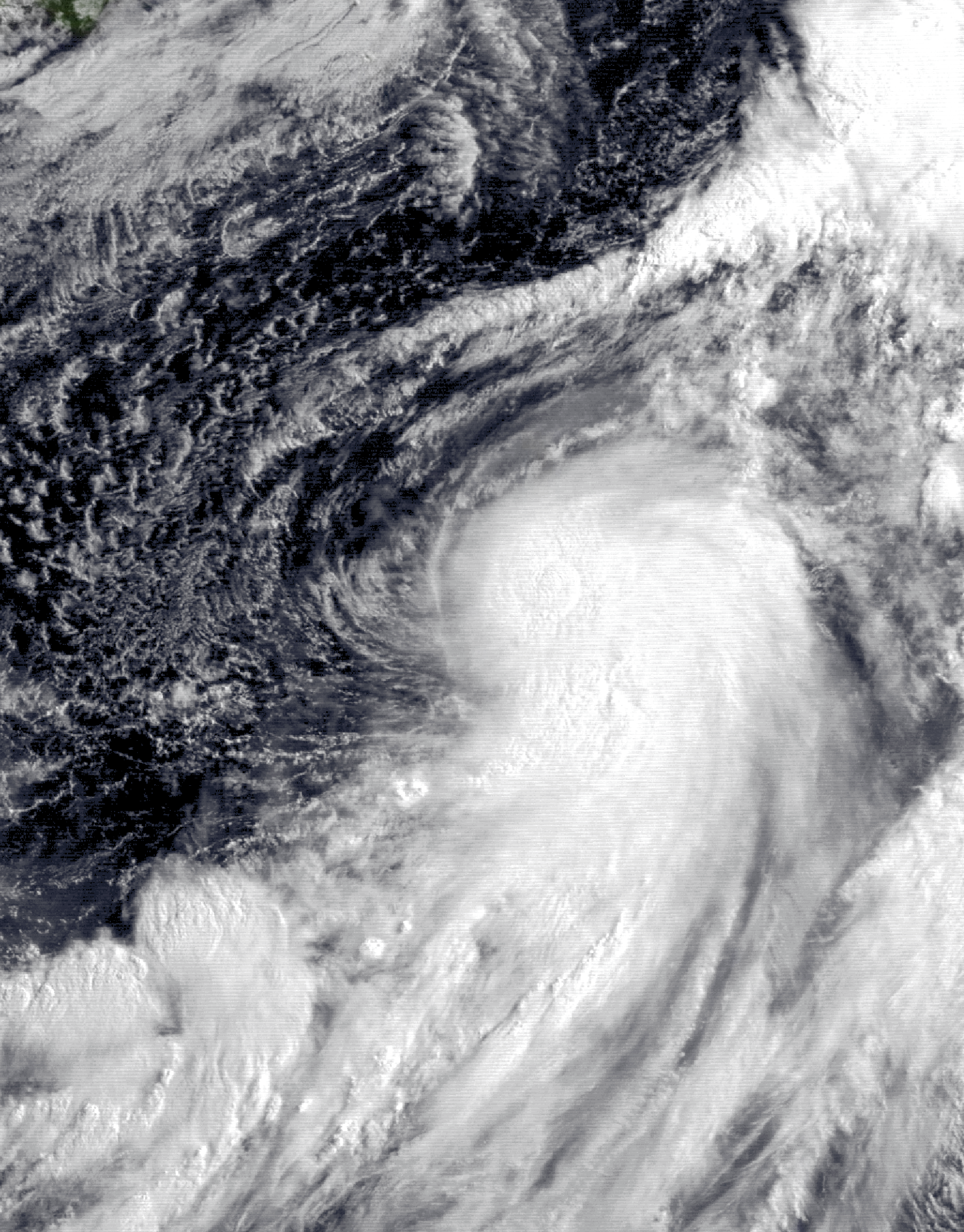
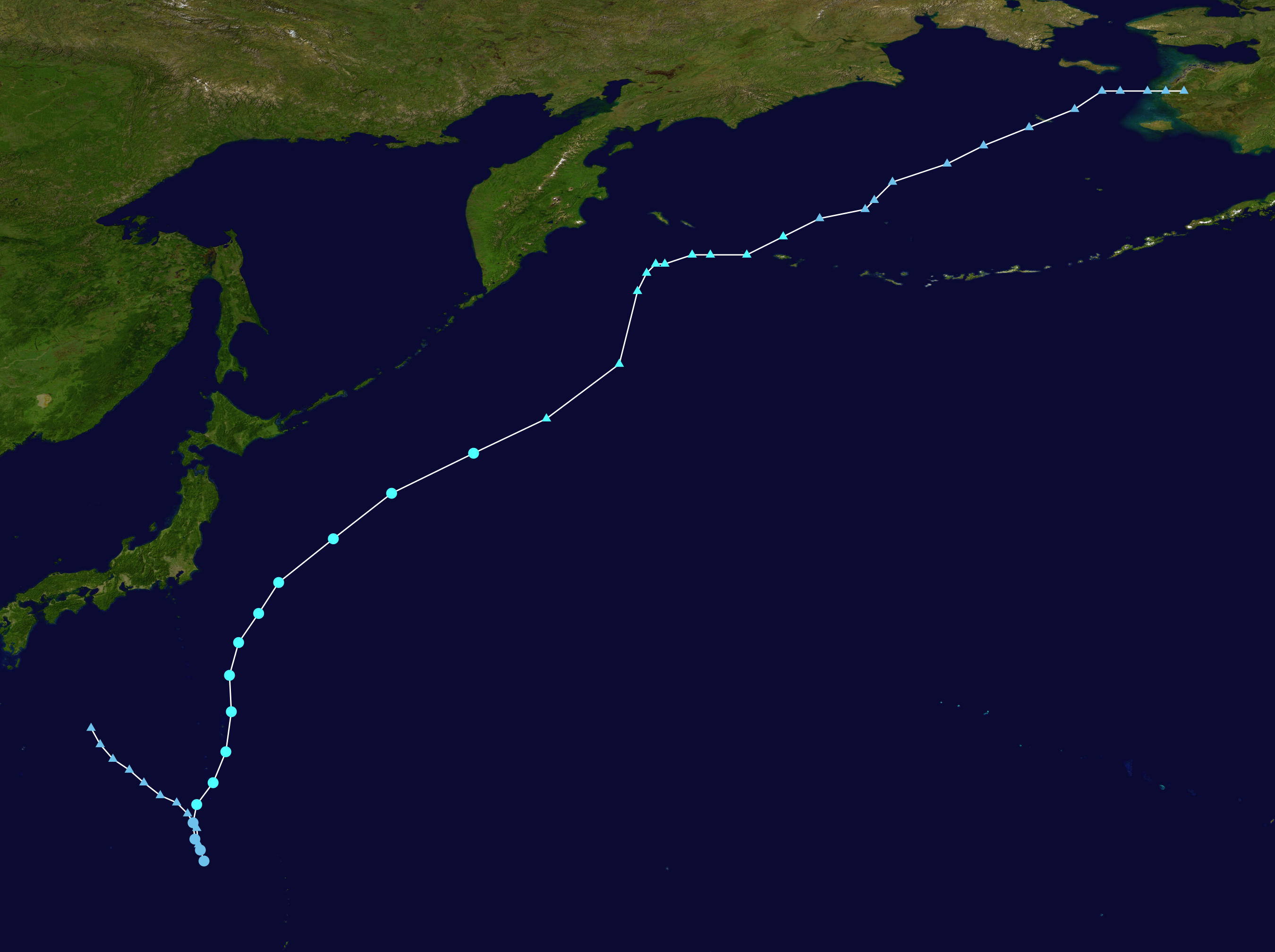
- Duration: July 27 – August 1
- Peak intensity: 95 km/h (60 mph) (10-min); 975 hPa (mbar)

Following the demise of Typhoon Warren, an area of disturbed weather formed southeast of Japan, and by July 27, this area had developed a closed surface circulation. At noon the same day, the JMA upgraded it into a tropical depression. Initially resembling a monsoon depression, the storm's upper-level outflow and organization increased on June 28 in response to decreased winds aloft. On June 29, both the JTWC and JMA upgraded the system into Tropical Storm Agnes. Contrary to forecasts, Agnes accelerated northeast in response to a trough northeast of Japan. At 00:00 UTC on June 30, the JTWC estimated a peak intensity of 80 km/h (50 mph) and the JMA estimated a peak intensity of 95 km/h (60 mph), making Agnes a severe tropical storm. Twelve hours later, the system lost all its deep convection, and the JTWC issued its last warning on it at 18:00 UTC. Despite this, the JMA continued to follow Agnes through August 4, three days after the agency declared Agnes extratropical.

=== JMA Tropical Storm Eight ===
- Tropical storm (JMA)
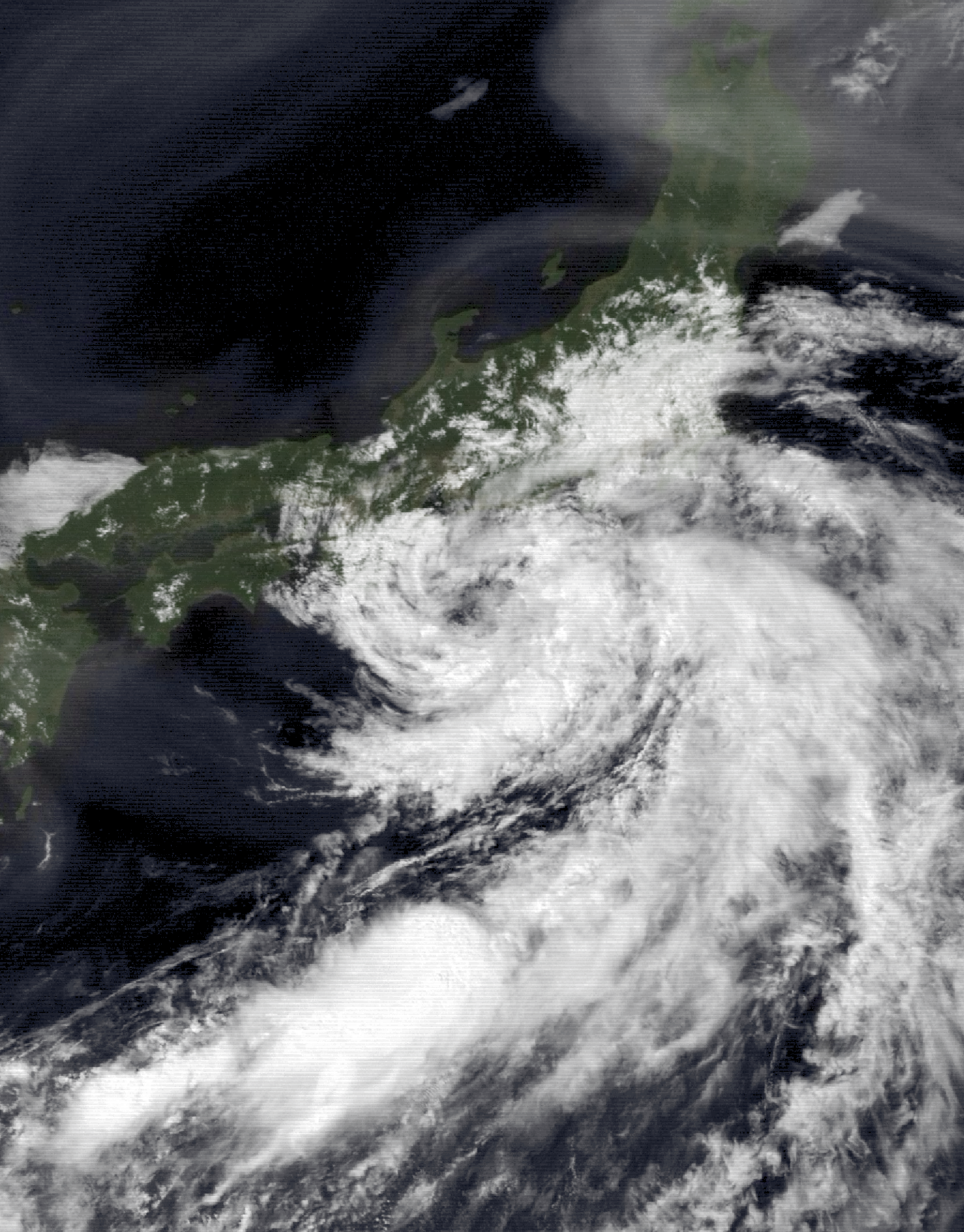
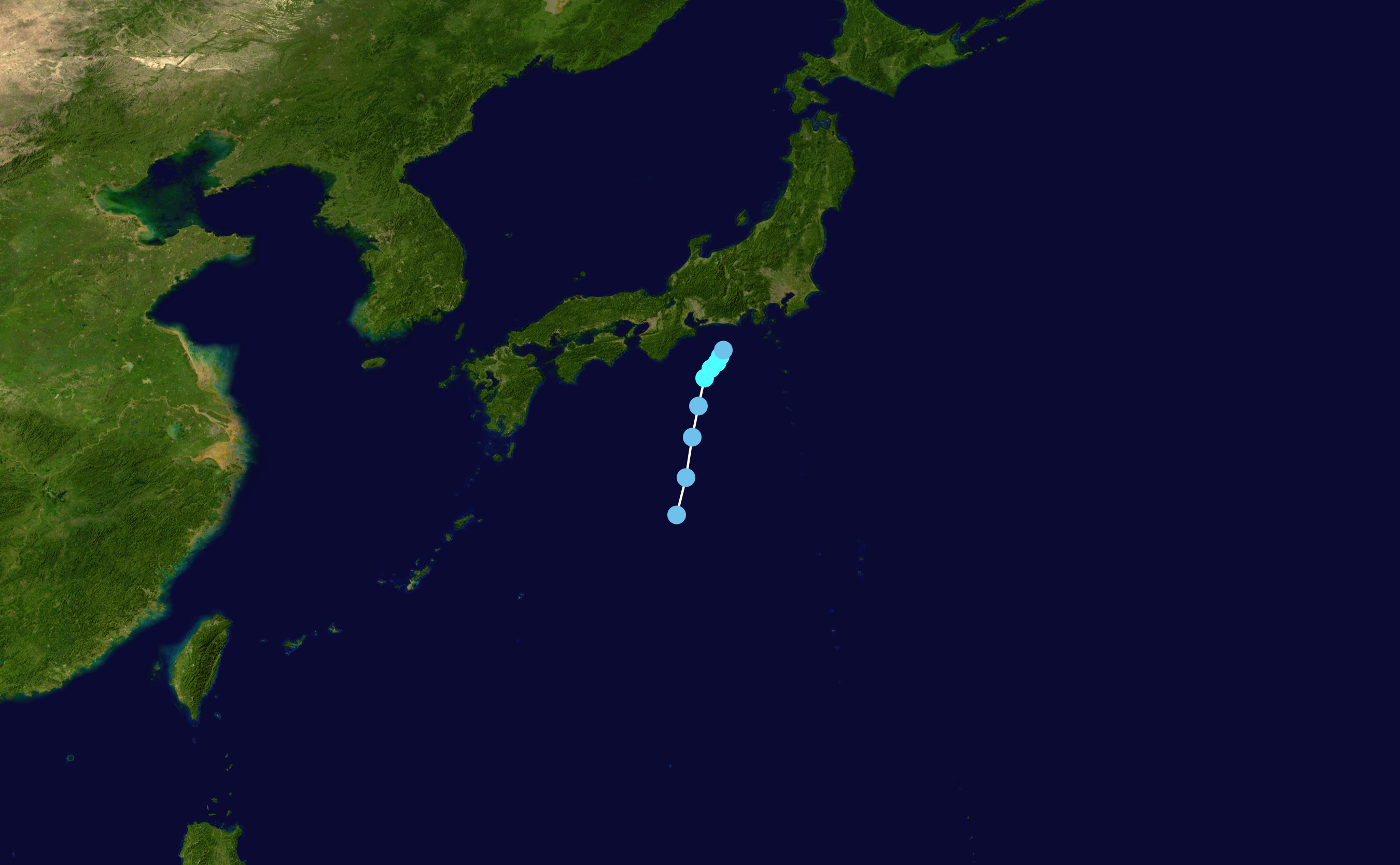
- Duration: July 30 – August 3
- Peak intensity: 65 km/h (40 mph) (10-min); 998 hPa (mbar)

This was not tracked by the JTWC.

=== Tropical Storm Bill ===
- Tropical storm (JMA)
- Tropical storm (SSHWS)
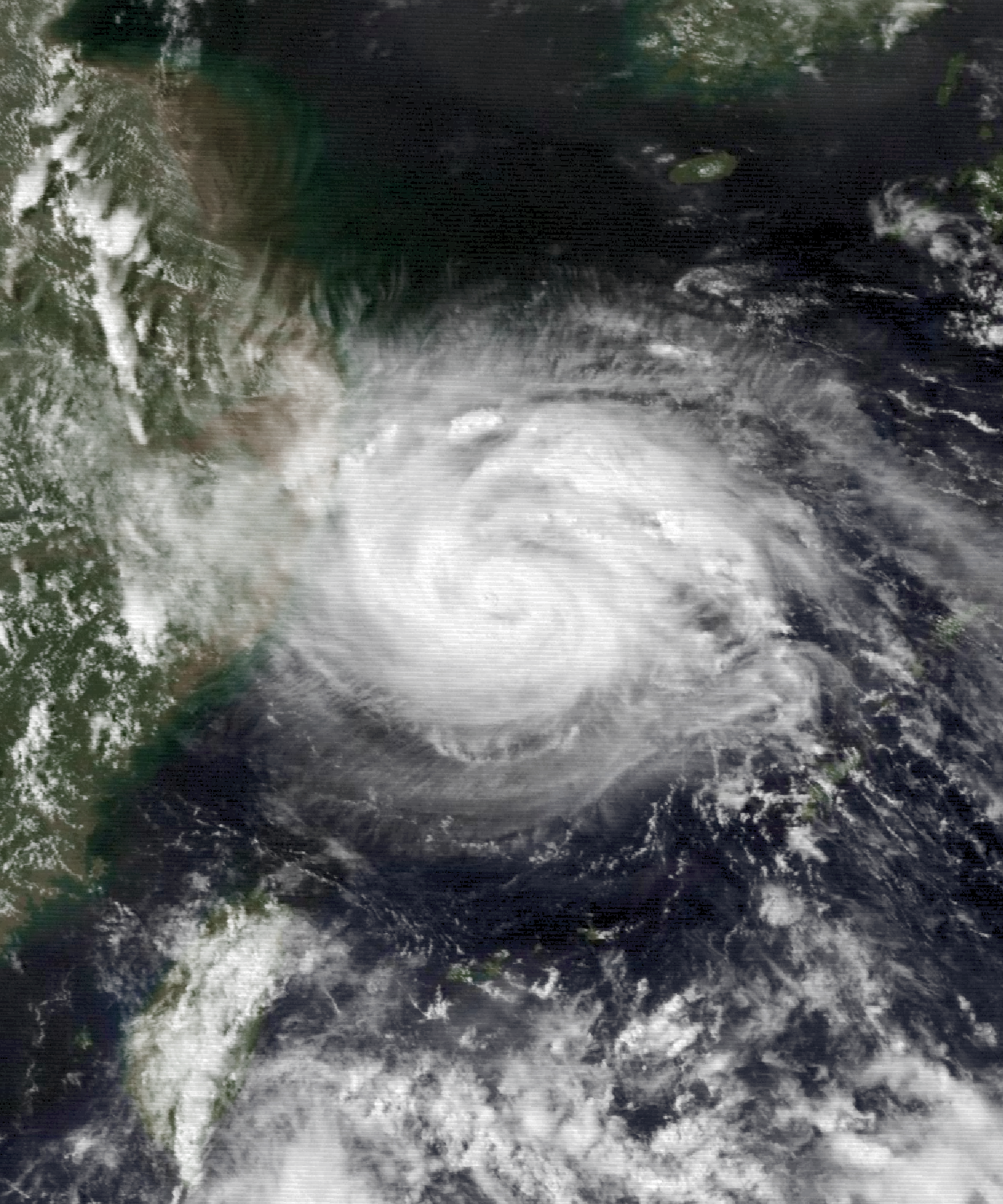
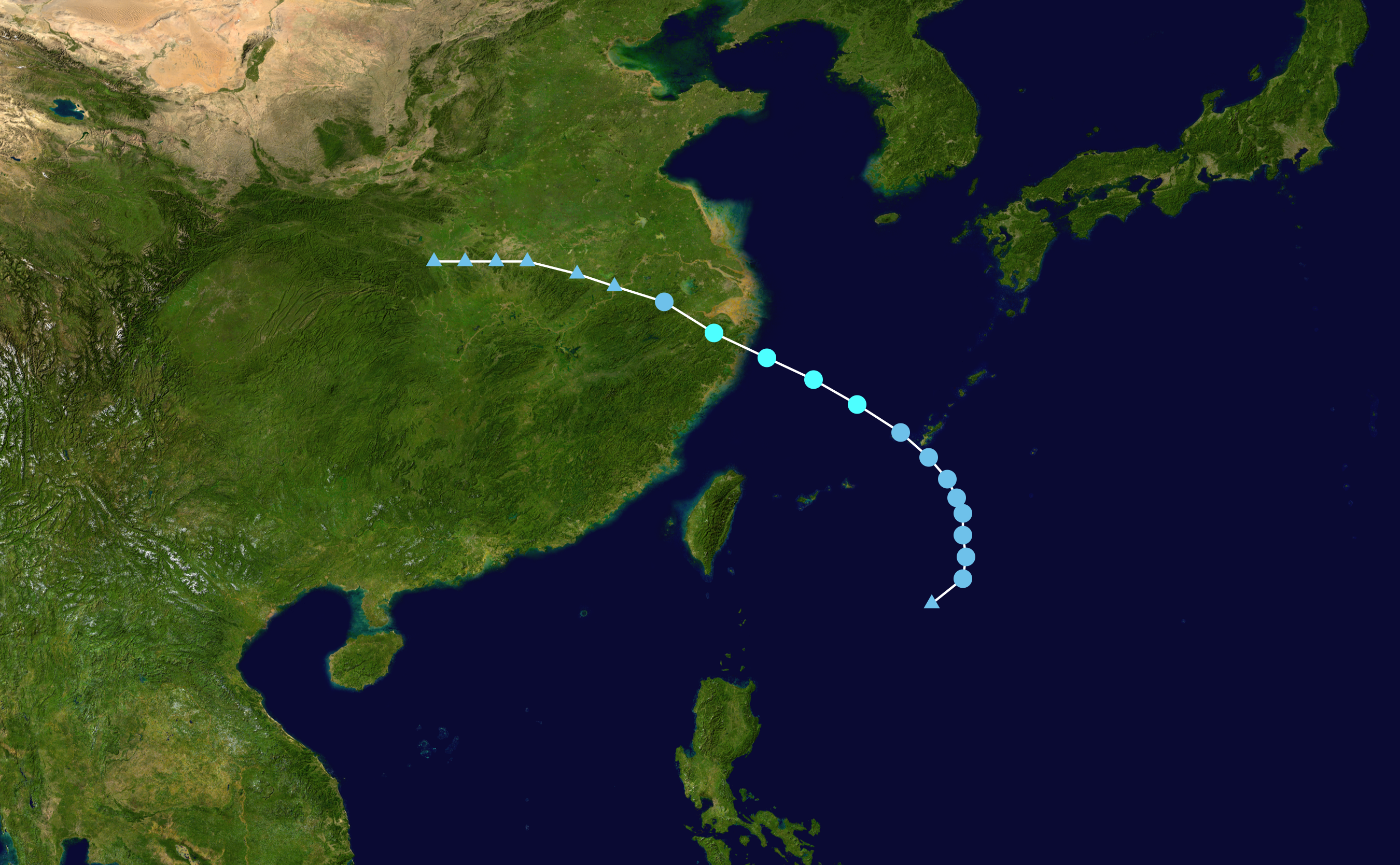
- Duration: August 4 – August 9
- Peak intensity: 85 km/h (50 mph) (10-min); 985 hPa (mbar)

On August 1, the monsoon trough stretched from the Gulf of Tonkin to Japan, but four days later, abruptly re-aligned. This created favorable conditions aloft for tropical cyclone formation, and an area of convection in the Philippine Sea began to rapidly develop. On the evening of August 4, the JMA upgraded the disturbance into a tropical depression, and the next day, the JTWC issued a Tropical Cyclone Formation Alert (TCFA). However, its development rate slowed as the system separated from the monsoon trough. Tracking northeast, the low passed just southwest of the southern tip of Okinawa at 15:00 UTC on August 6. That day, the JMA upgraded the depression into a tropical storm, though the JTWC did not do the same until 24 hours later. Shortly thereafter, both agencies indicated that Bill attained its peak velocity of 80 km/h (50 mph), an intensity it would maintain until making landfall 220 km (135 mi) south of Shanghai. Although the JTWC issued its final advisory at 00:00 UTC on August 8, with the JMA doing the same 36 hours later, its remains could still be identified through August 10.

Tropical Storm Bill, which formed on August 5 east of Taiwan, moved northwest to hit eastern China as a 45 mph tropical storm. Torrential rains and heavy flooding resulted in 110 casualties and widespread damage to roads and dams losses were estimated at 1 billion RMB (US$268 million).

=== Tropical Storm Clara ===
- Tropical storm (JMA)
- Tropical storm (SSHWS)
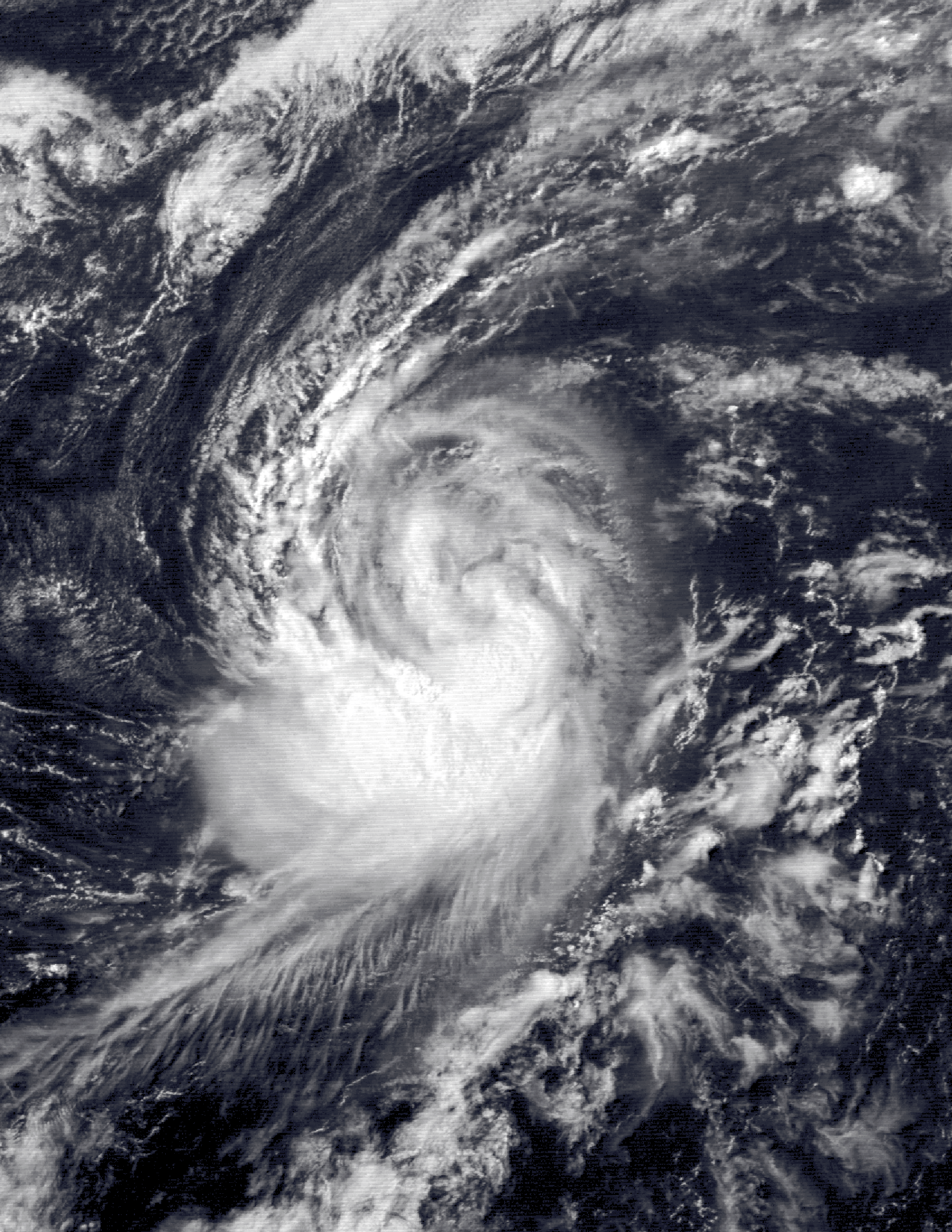
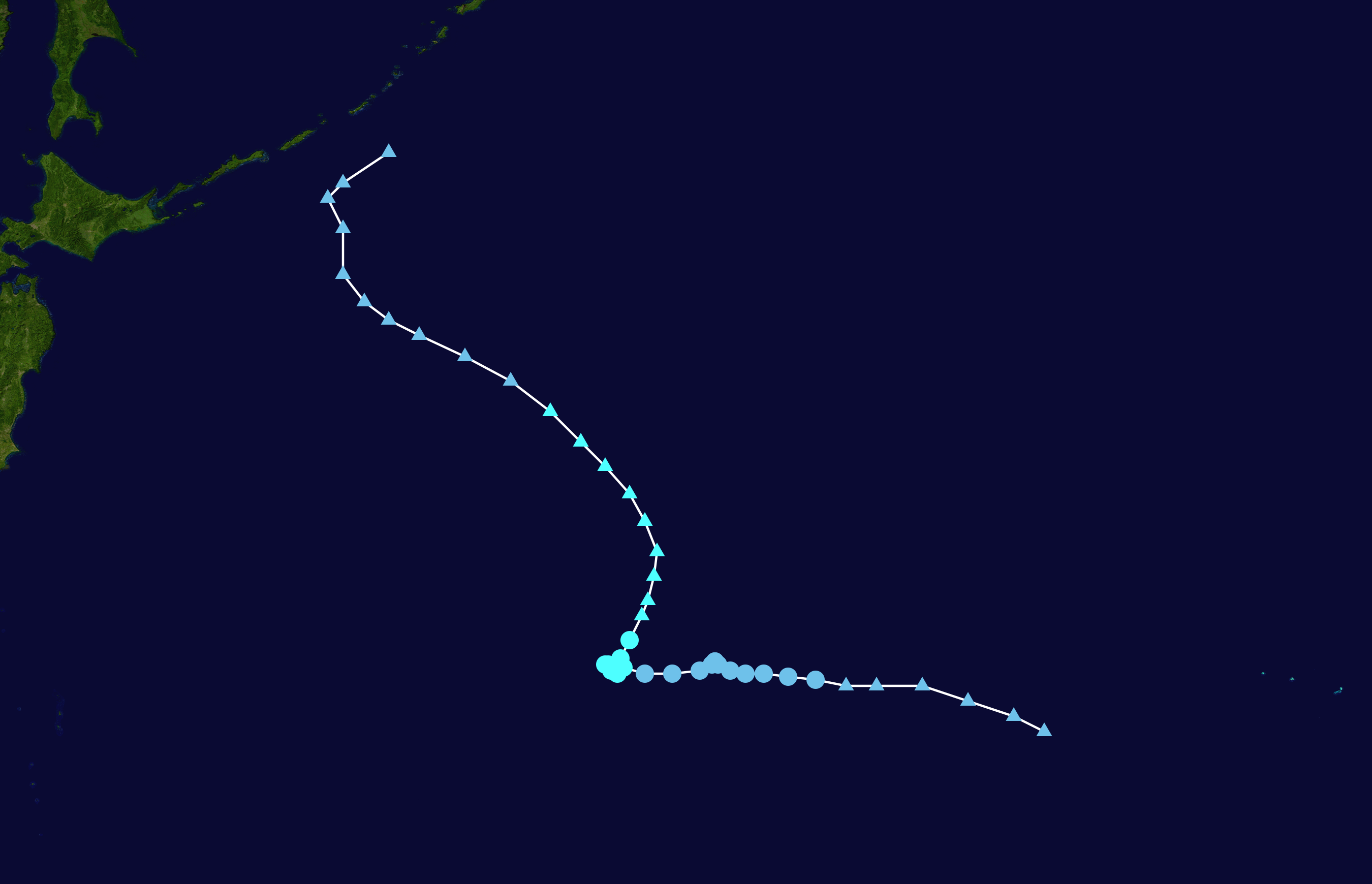
- Duration: August 5 – August 16
- Peak intensity: 75 km/h (45 mph) (10-min); 994 hPa (mbar)

An area of disorganized convection about 1,000 km (620 mi) north of Wake Island in early August. The disturbance was classified on August 5 by the JMA. The depression tracked westward under the influence of a subtropical ridge. Two days later, the system began to organize, although shower activity remained exposed from the center. Strong wind shear prevented further development, but by August 10, thunderstorm activity had increased in coverage. At 19:15 UTC the same day, the JTWC upgraded it to Tropical Storm Clara, with the JMA following suit around the same time. Due to a strengthening ridge, Clara performed a counterclockwise loop, only to turn northeast on August 11. Around this time, the JTWC and JMA estimated that Clara attained peak winds of 80 and 70 km/h (50 and 45 mph). Shortly afterwards, shower activity quickly became displaced from the deep convection, prompting a weakening trend. The JTWC issued its final warning on August 12, though the JMA did not following suit until four days later.

=== JMA Tropical Storm Eleven ===
- Tropical storm (JMA)
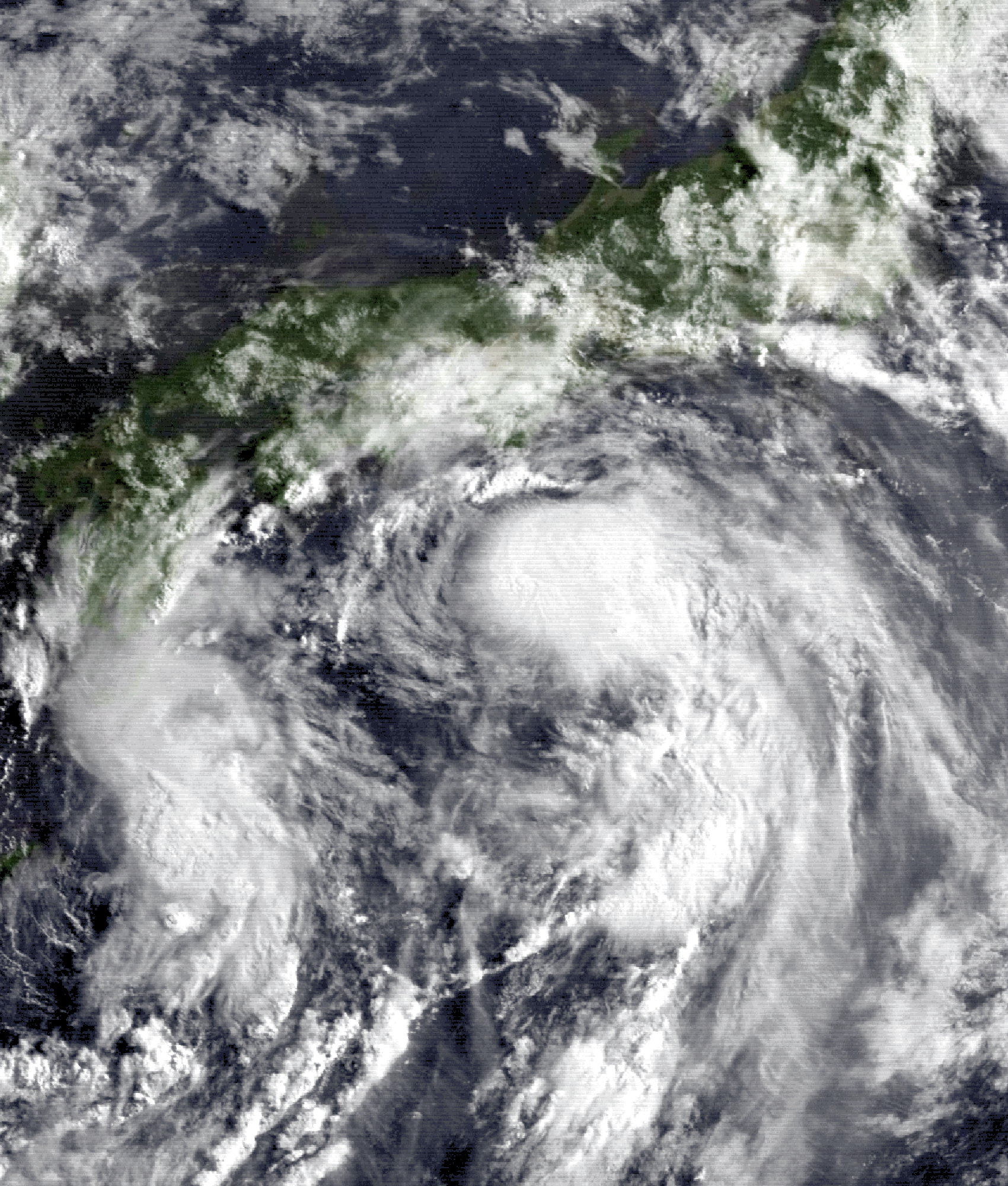
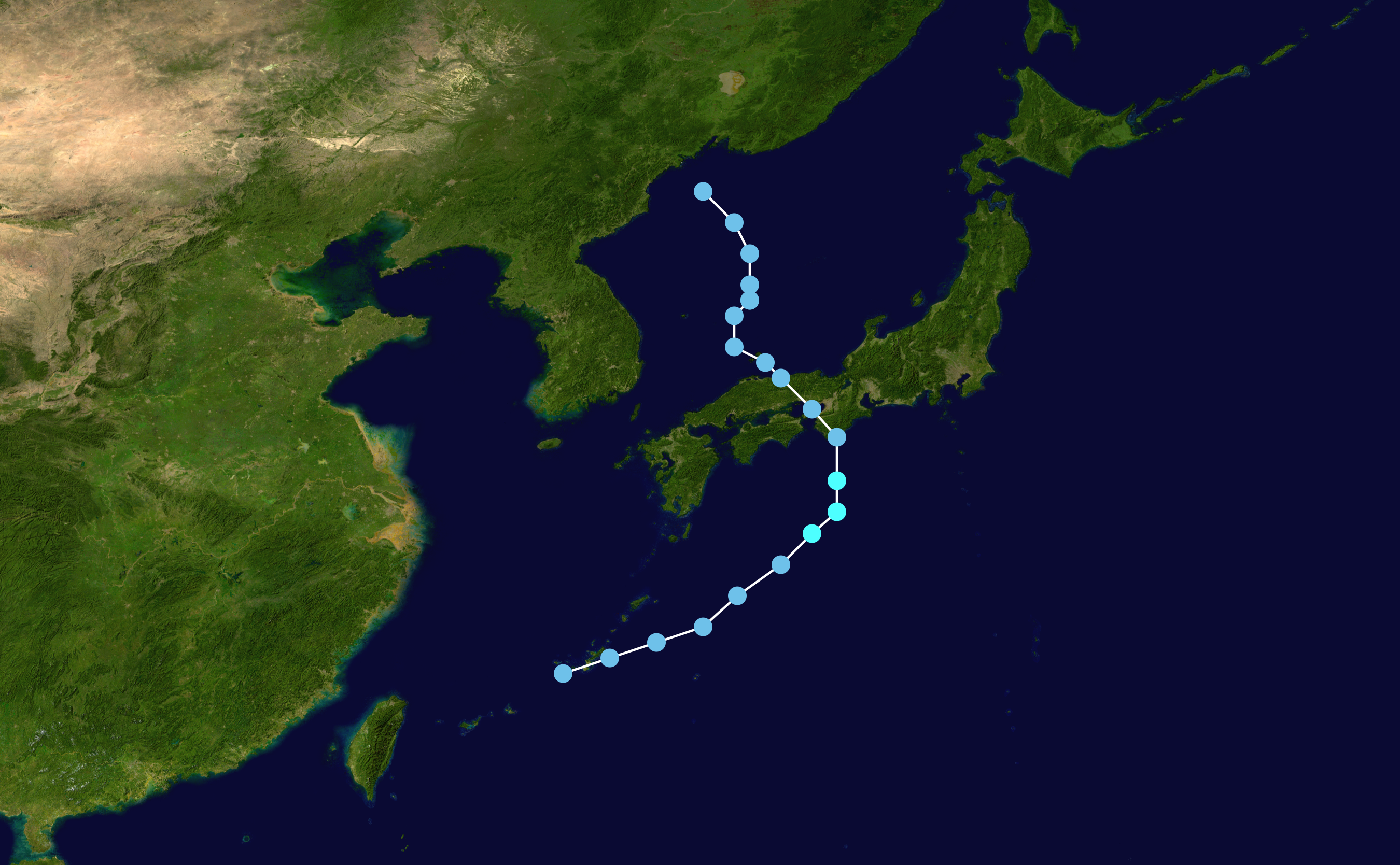
- Duration: August 13 – August 18
- Peak intensity: 65 km/h (40 mph) (10-min); 1000 hPa (mbar)

This was not tracked by the JTWC.

=== Typhoon Doyle ===
- Very strong typhoon (JMA)
- Category 4 typhoon (SSHWS)
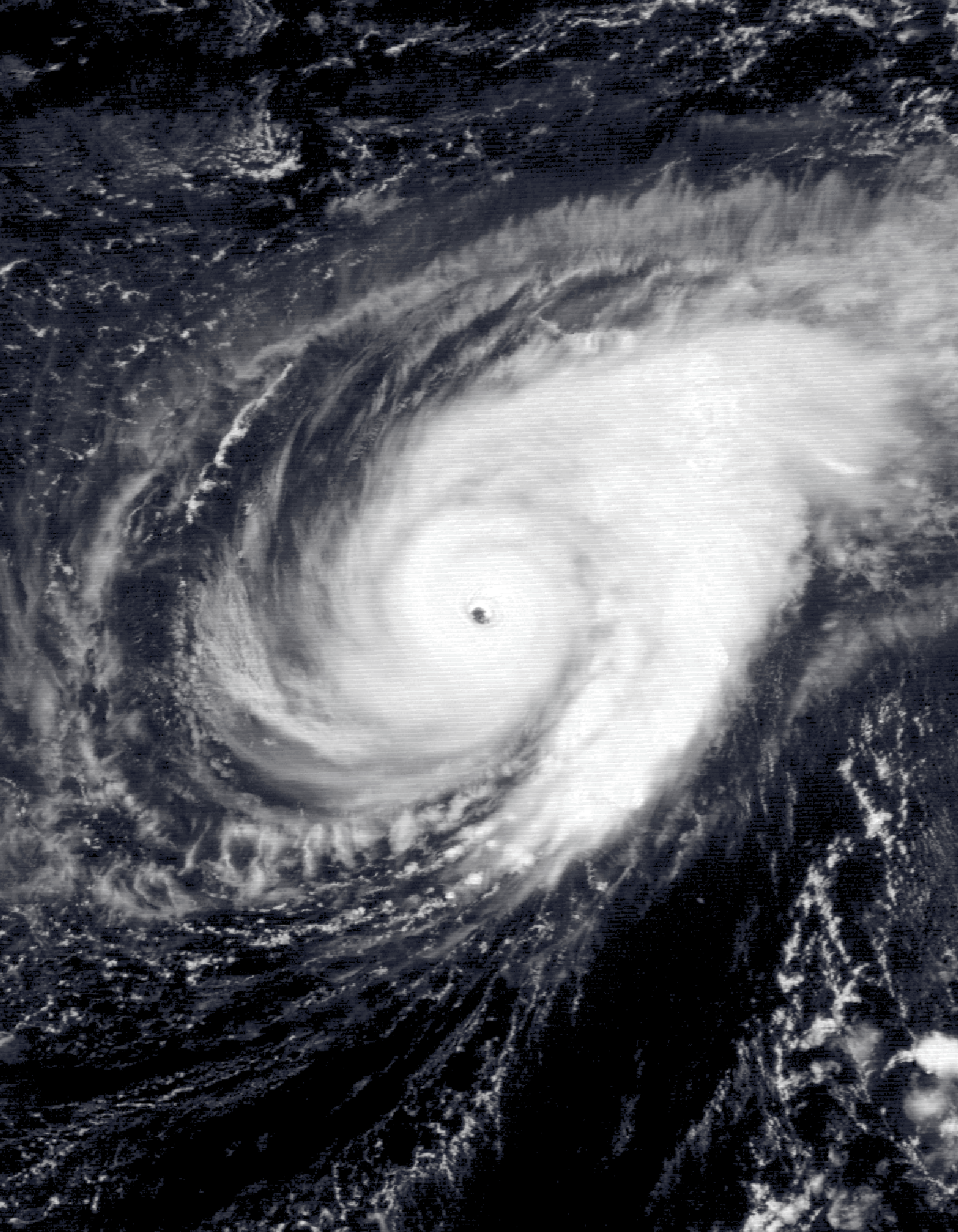
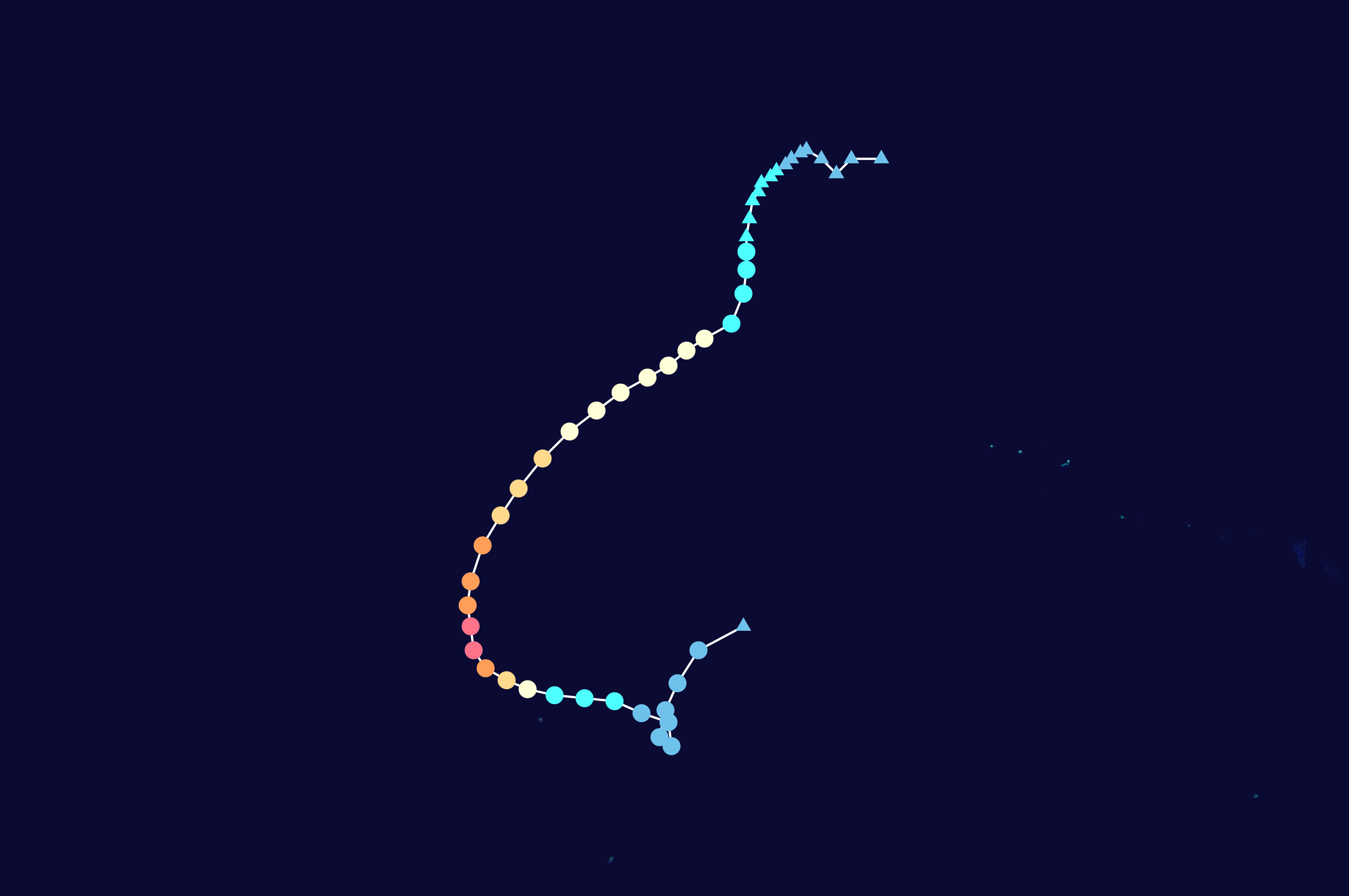
- Duration: August 13 – August 24
- Peak intensity: 165 km/h (105 mph) (10-min); 930 hPa (mbar)

On August 12, a westward-moving area of disturbed weather developed within the monsoon trough. Deep convection developed near the low-level center on the next day, and the JMA classified the disturbance as a tropical depression. Overnight August 13 into August 14, the depression began to organize, and after performing a counterclockwise loop, it began moving to the west-northwest. At 18:00 UTC the same day, the JMA upgraded the depression into a tropical storm, though the JTWC did not follow suit until 18 hours later. Doyle then entered a period of rapid deepening, with the JMA upgrading Doyle into a typhoon on the morning of August 16. At 18:00 UTC, the JTWC estimated that Doyle attained peak winds of 210 km/h (130 mph), although according to the JMA, Doyle did not reach its peak intensity of 170 km/h (105 mph). The typhoon then curved north as it rounded a subtropical ridge, although unlike most recurving tropical cyclones, a TUTT cell prevented. This change in forward motion led to a gradual weakening trend over cold water. On August 20, the JMA estimated that Doyle lost typhoon intensity, and two days later, downgraded it into a tropical depression. At this time, the system became devoid of deep convection prompted the JTWC to issue its final warning. The JMA estimated that Doyle became extratropical on August 25. The agency stopped following the extratropical remnants the next day.

Although the typhoon passed close to Wake Island near peak intensity, wind gusts only reached 45 mph (70 km/h) and according to the JTWC, damage was insignificant.

=== JMA Tropical Storm Thirteen ===
- Tropical storm (JMA)
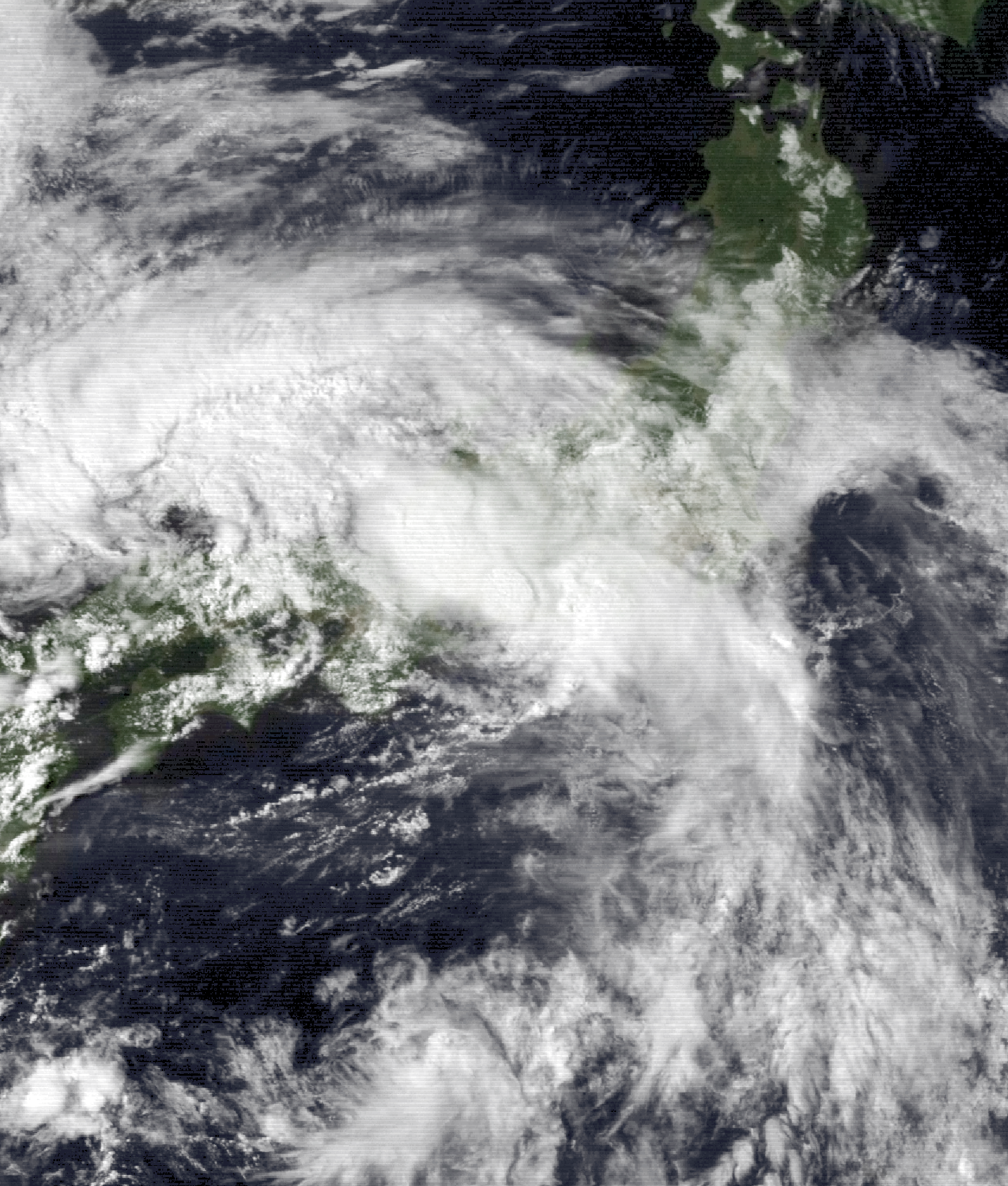
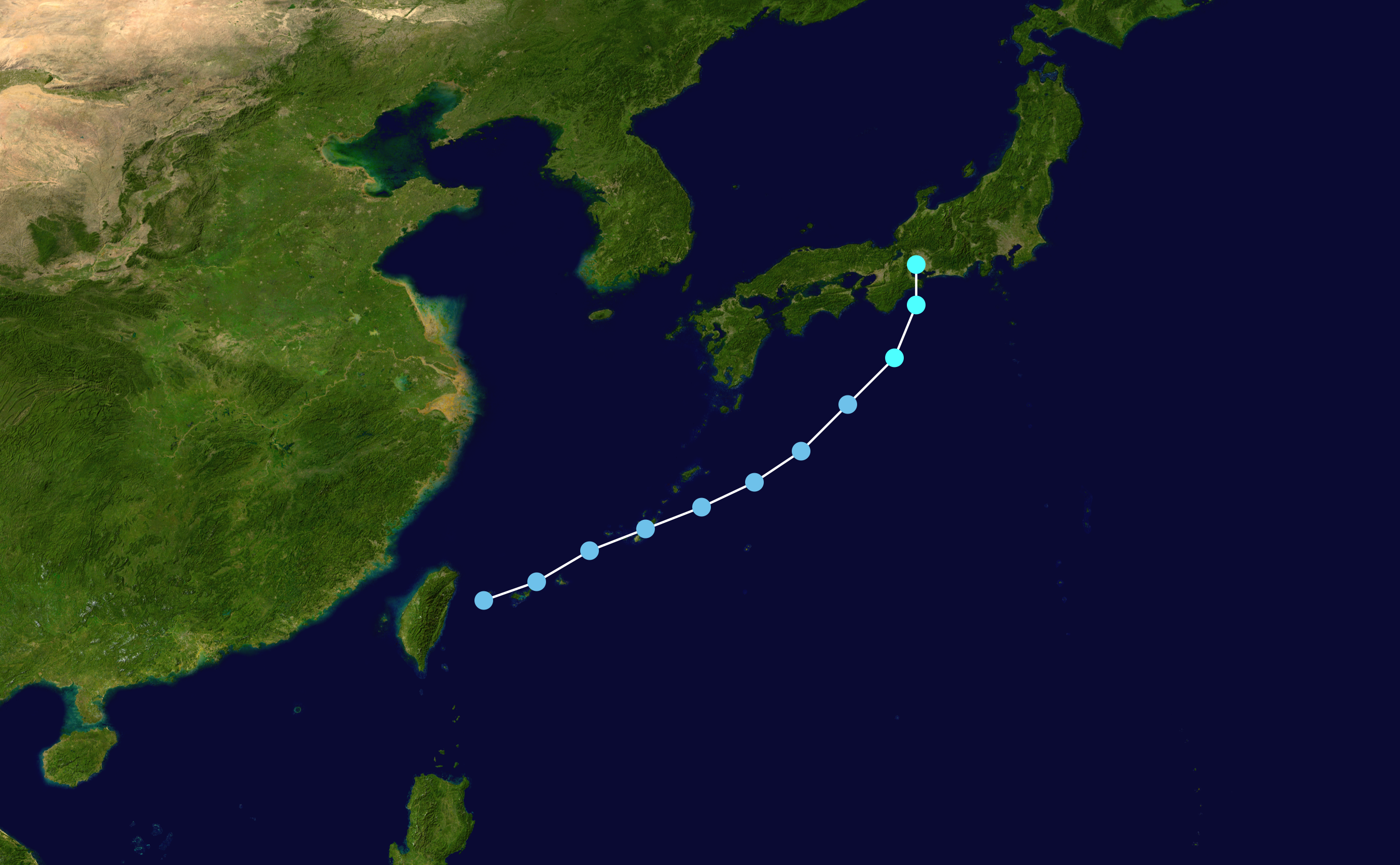
- Duration: August 13 – August 16
- Peak intensity: 65 km/h (40 mph) (10-min); 1000 hPa (mbar)

This was not tracked by the JTWC.

=== Tropical Storm Elsie ===
- Tropical storm (JMA)
- Tropical storm (SSHWS)
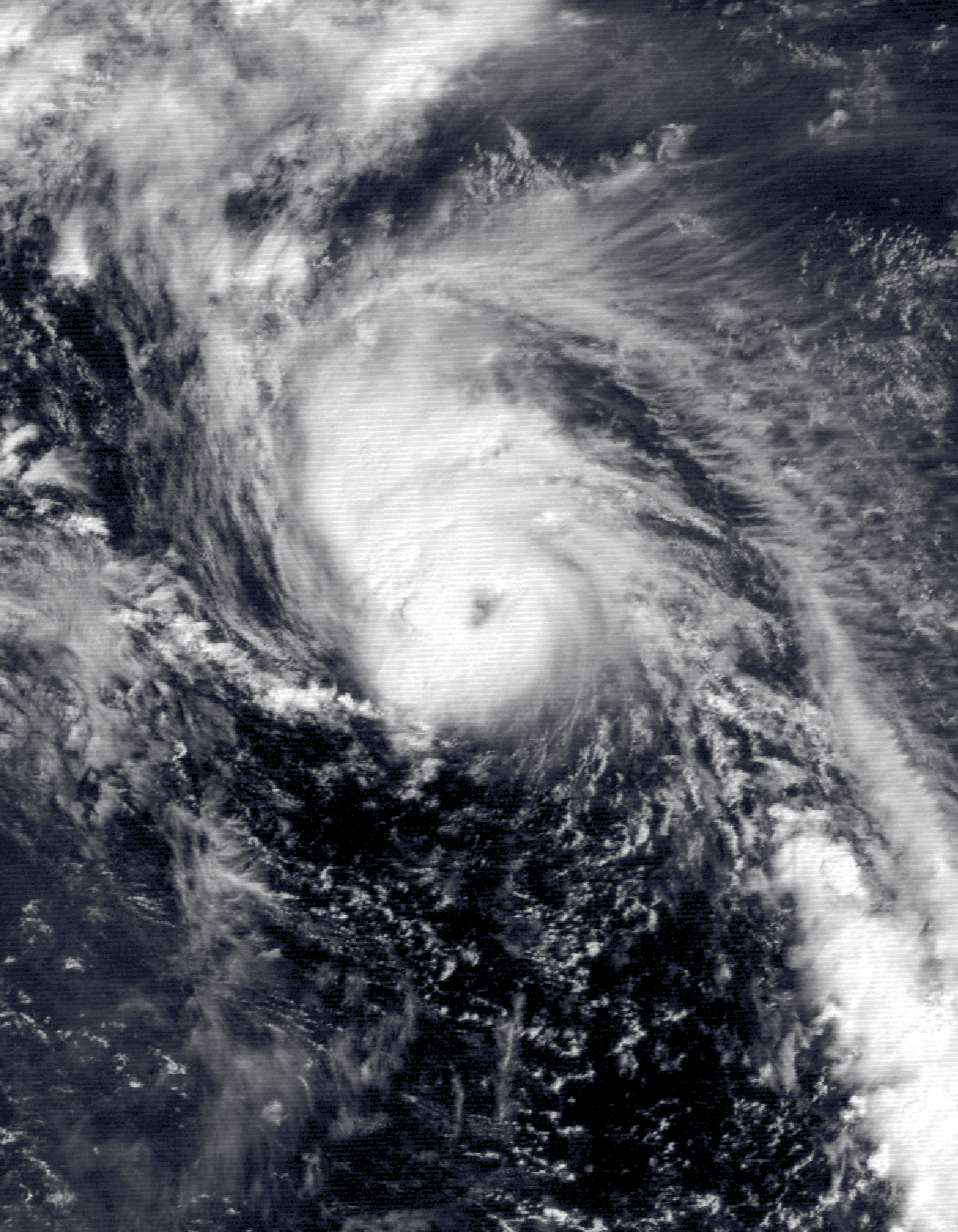
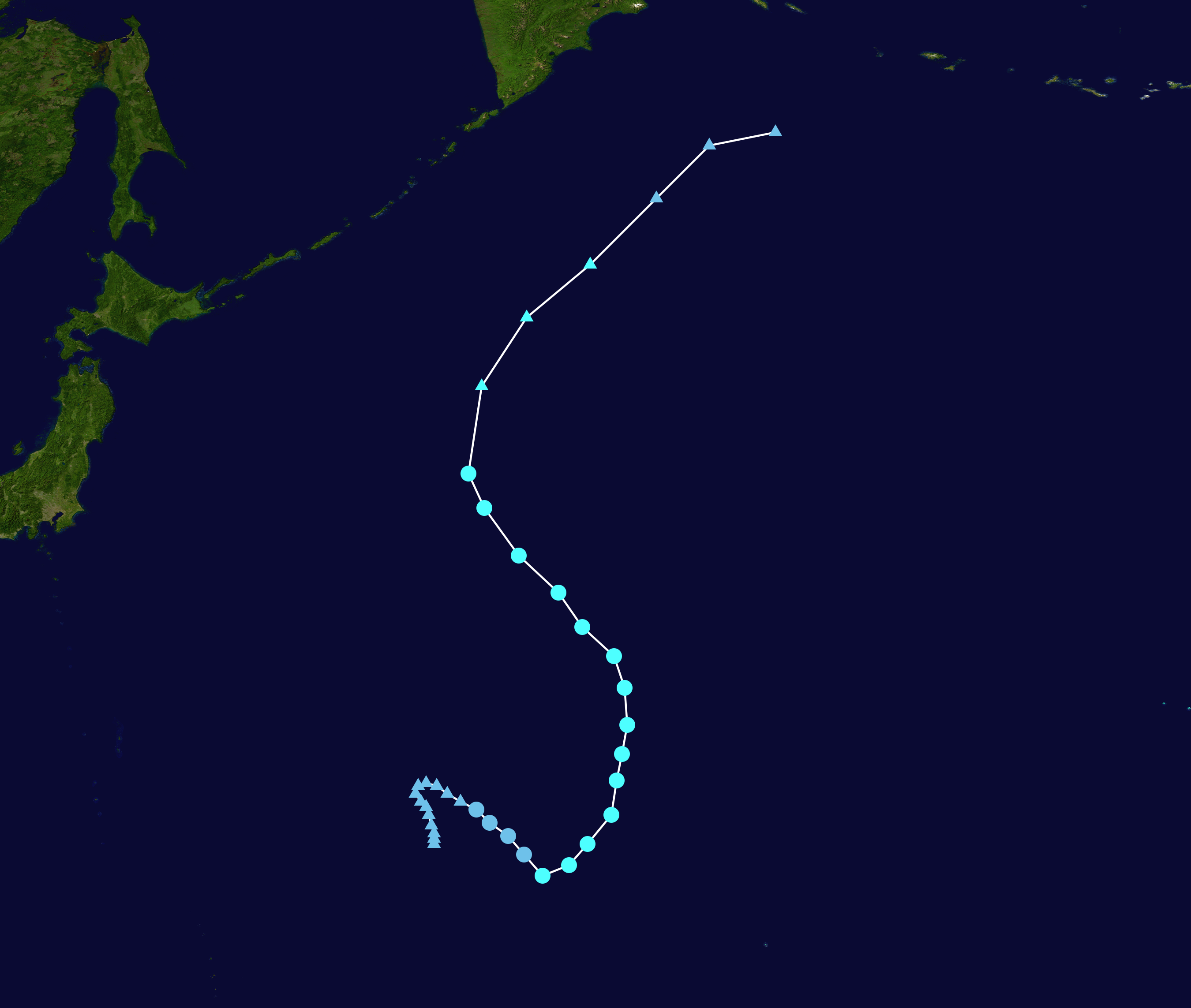
- Duration: August 26 – September 1
- Peak intensity: 85 km/h (50 mph) (10-min); 992 hPa (mbar)

On August 24, a persistent area of convection embedded in the monsoon trough was first detected. Despite favorable conditions aloft, the disturbance initially remained poorly organized. The JMA declared the system a tropical depression at 00:00 UTC on August 24, although the depression only started to organize on August 28. Dvorak classifications prompted the JTWC to upgrade the system into a tropical storm at midday, with the JMA following suit early on August 29. After tracking southeast, Elsie turned northeast. Interaction from newly formed Tropical Storm Fabian initially halted further intensification and the JTWC estimated that the storm was briefly no longer a classifiable tropical cyclone on August 30. At 00:00 UTC on August 31, the JMA estimated that Elsie reached its highest velocity of 80 km/h (50 mph). The storm then accelerated to the northeast while becoming extratropical and at 18:00 the same day, the JTWC classified Elsie as extratropical, with the JMA doing the same on September 1.

=== Severe Tropical Storm Fabian ===
- Severe tropical storm (JMA)
- Category 1 typhoon (SSHWS)
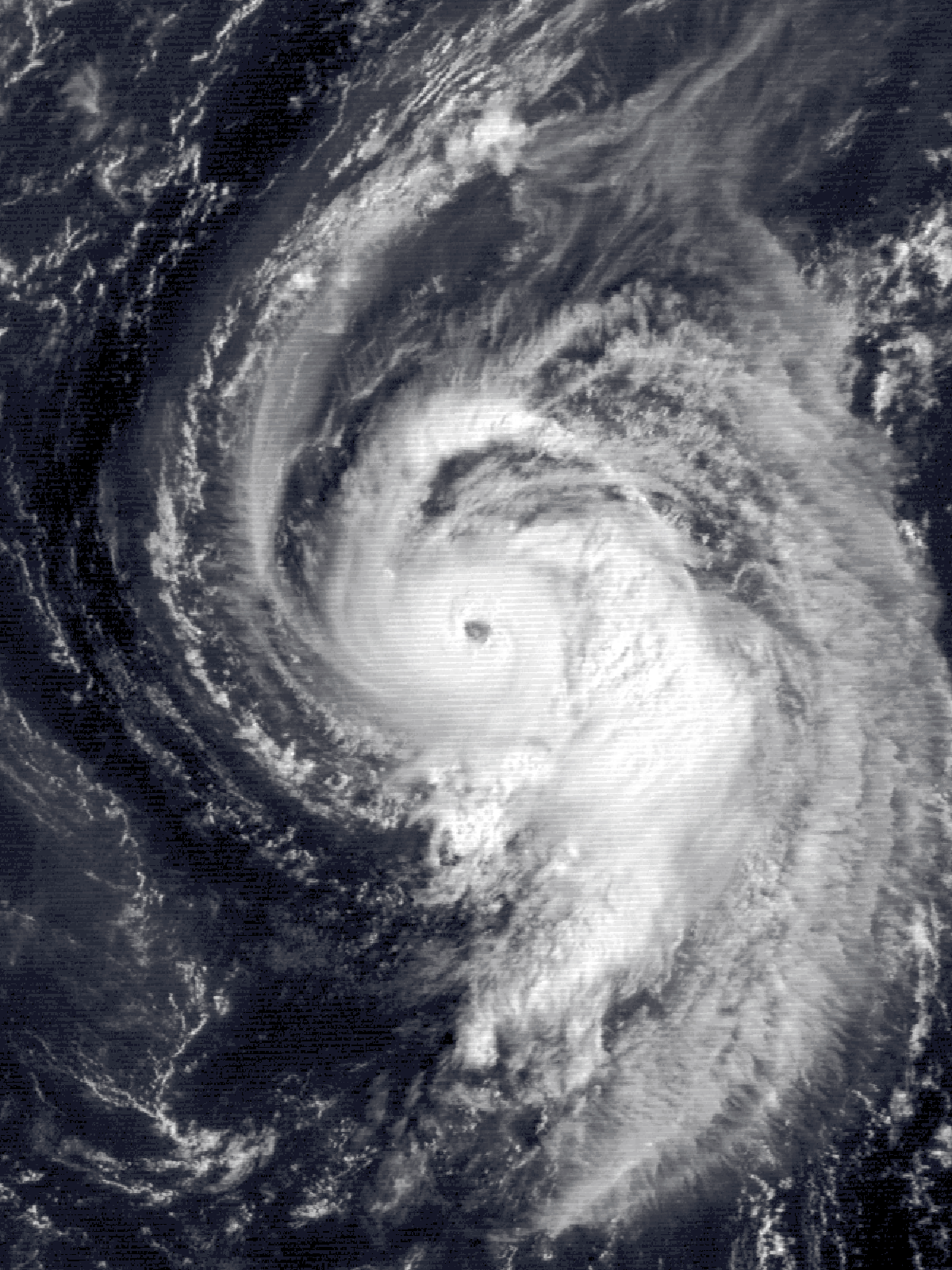
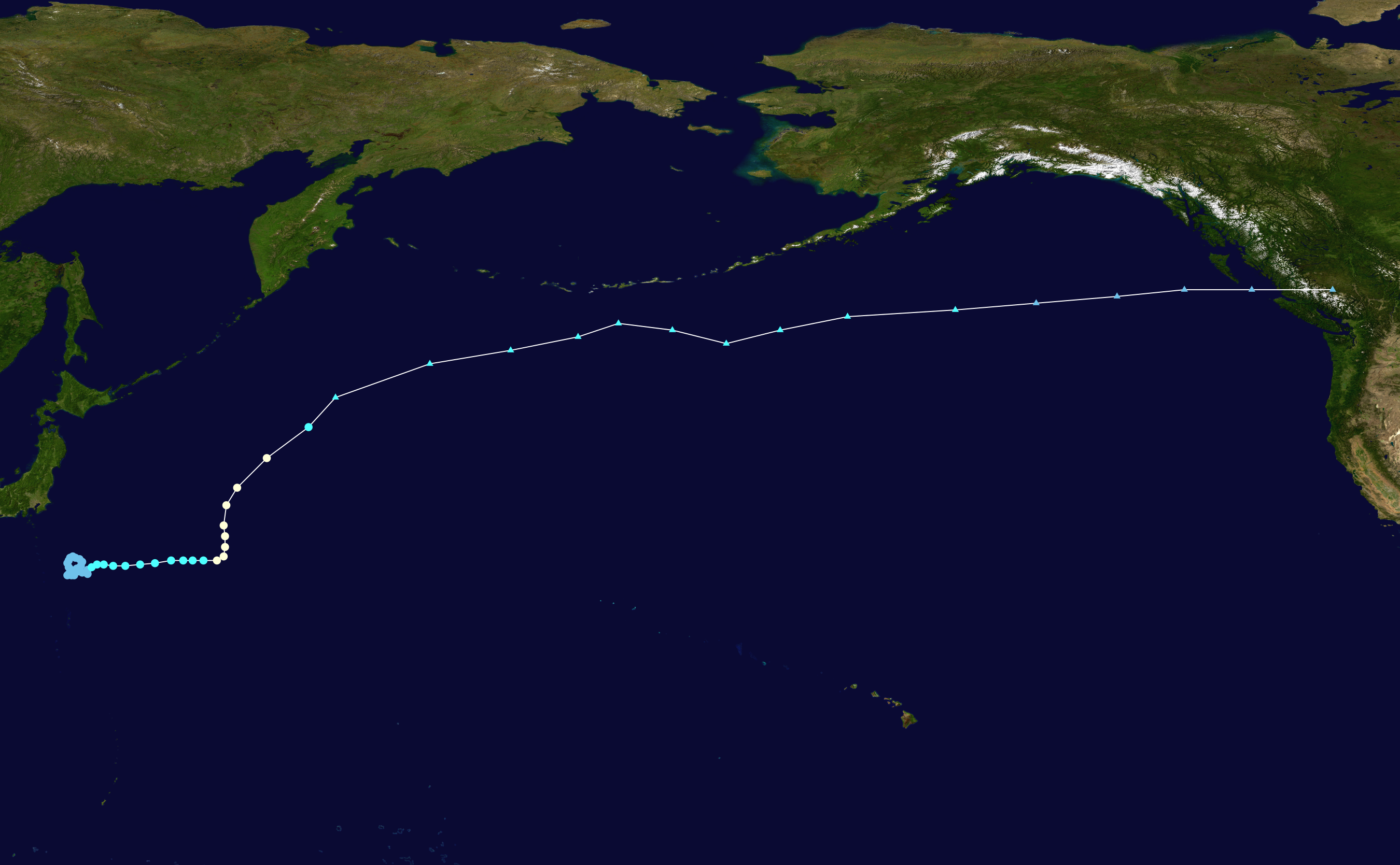
- Duration: August 26 – September 3
- Peak intensity: 110 km/h (70 mph) (10-min); 970 hPa (mbar)

Also on August 24, another area of disturbed weather was spotted within the monsoon trough, which was displaced from its normal position. Thunderstorm activity gradually improved in organization, and at 06:00 UTC on August 26, the JMA designated the system a tropical depression. The depression was upgraded into a tropical storm three days later by the JMA. Interaction with Elsie – the storms at one point were within 460 mi (740 km) of each other – caused the cyclone to track eastward. Dvorak estimates of T3.0/80 km/h (50 mph) prompted the JTWC to upgrade it to a tropical storm on August 30, with the JMA upgrading it to a severe tropical storm that evening. Interaction with Elsie failed to stop Fabian from intensifying, and at 06:00 UTC on September 1, the JTWC upgraded Fabian into a typhoon, only for the storm to veer north shortly thereafter. On September 2, the JMA and the JTWC estimated that Fabian attained peak intensities of 115 and 135 km/h (70 and 85 mph) respectively. Accelerating, Fabian began to encounter stronger westerly wind shear, which led to weakening. The JTWC declared Fabian an extratropical cyclone at 06:00 UTC on September 32, with the JMA doing the same on the next day.

=== Tropical Storm Gay ===
- Tropical storm (JMA)
- Tropical storm (SSHWS)
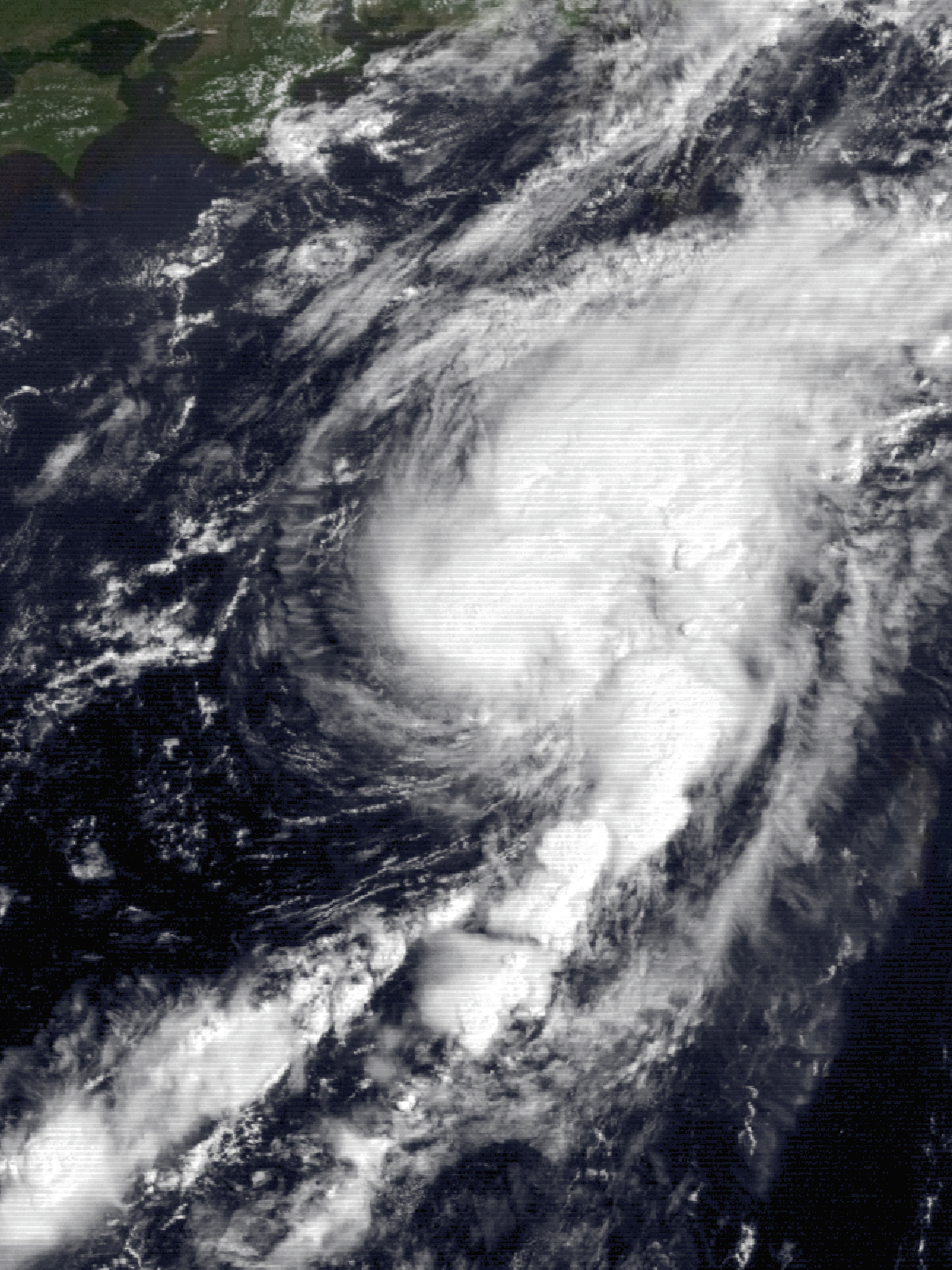
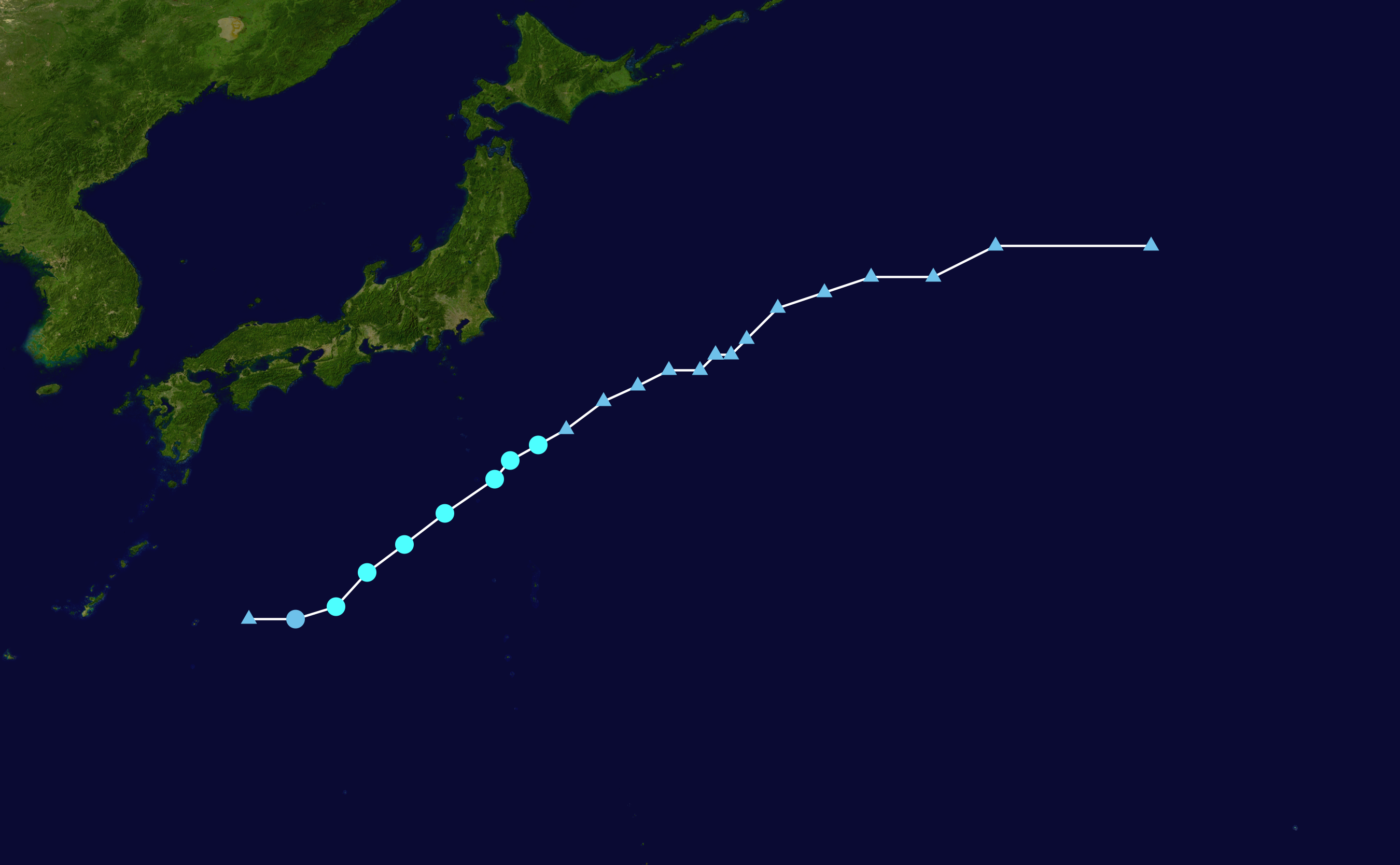
- Duration: September 2 – September 7
- Peak intensity: 75 km/h (45 mph) (10-min); 996 hPa (mbar)

An area of disturbed weather formed in the monsoon trough around 780 km (485 mi) east of Okinawa. The JMA upgraded the area into a tropical depression at 00:00 UTC on September 2. Surface observations of 25 to 35 mph (40 to 56 km/h) along with Dvorak estimate of T2.5/65 km/h (40 mph) prompted a TCFA at 10:40 UTC, with the JTWC designating the system as Tropical Storm Gay the same evening. At 0:00 UTC on September 3 the JMA followed suit and upgraded Gay into a tropical storm. Moving northeastward, Gay quickly intensified, and on September 3, the JTWC and JMA estimated peak intensity of 80 and 70 km/h (50 and 45 mph) respectively. Gay quickly weakened, however, due to strong wind shear. On September 4, the JTWC reported that Gay dissipated, although the JMA continued to track it as a weak tropical depression until September 7.

=== Typhoon Uleki ===
- Typhoon (JMA)
- Category 2 typhoon (SSHWS)
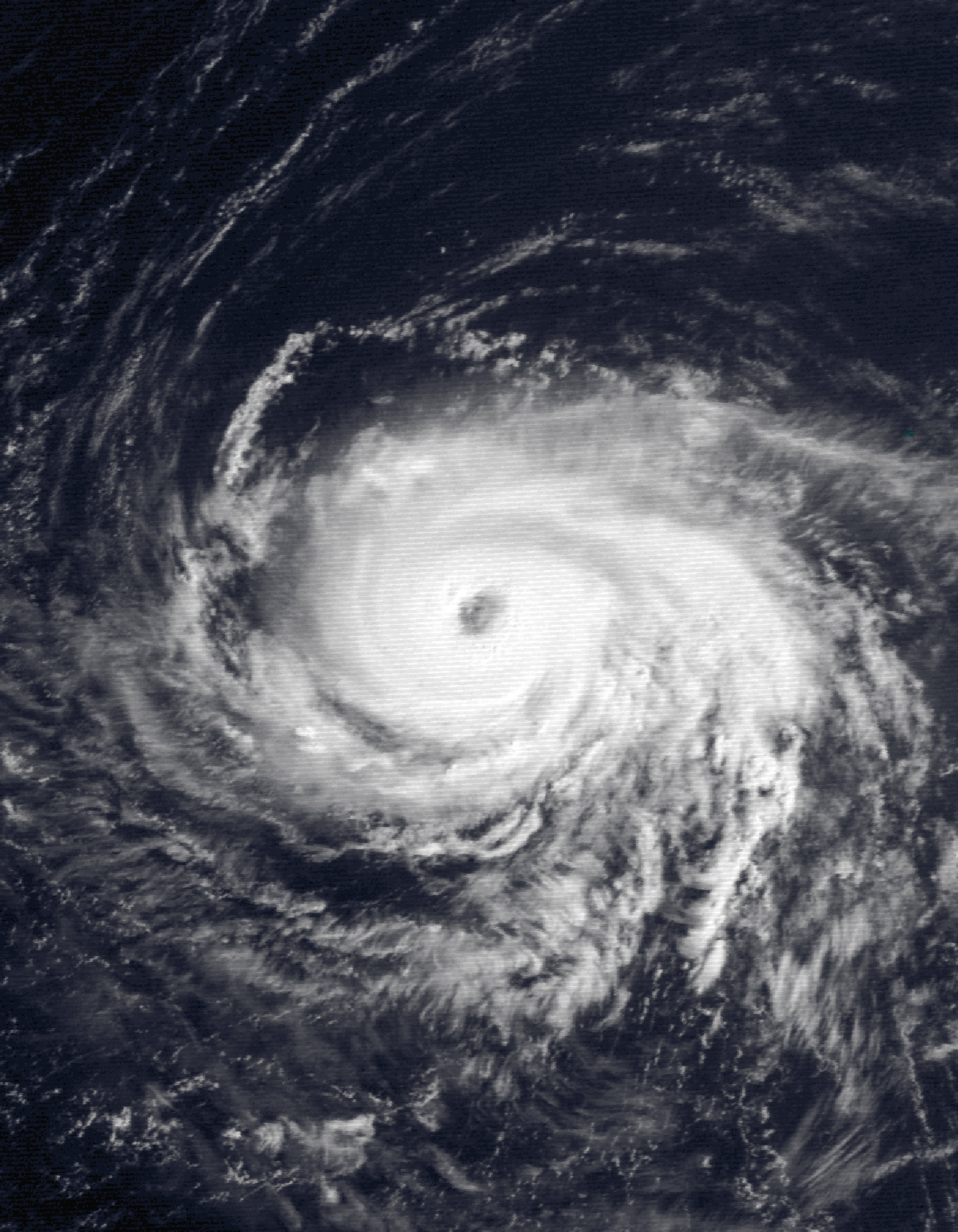
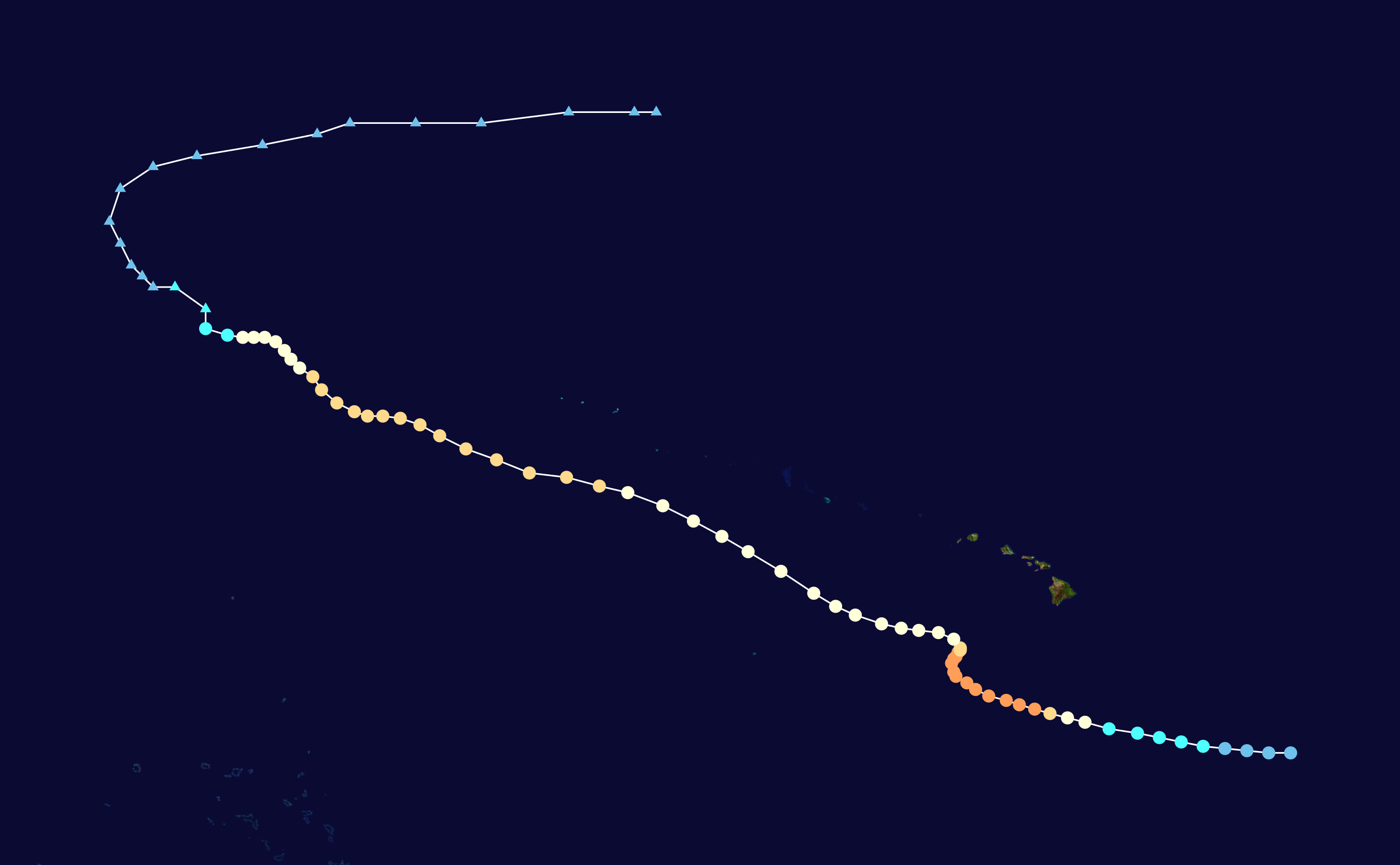
- Duration: September 8 (entered basin) – September 16
- Peak intensity: 130 km/h (80 mph) (10-min); 945 hPa (mbar)

Uleki had developed on August 28 well to the southeast of Hawai'i and become a hurricane in the north-central Pacific before crossing the International Date Line. At 00:00 UTC on September 8, the CPHC transferred warning responsibility of Uleki to the Joint Typhoon Warning Center (JTWC) and the storm was subsequently referred to as a typhoon. Three hours later Uleki made its closest approach to Midway Atoll, passing 200 mi (320 km) to the south. Shortly thereafter the system crossed the International Date Line and the Japan Meteorological Agency (JMA) also began advising on the system. The JMA estimated Uleki to have had a pressure of 945 mbar (945 hPa; 27.9 inHg) at this time; however, this value was derived from satellite estimates rather than direct measurements. Uleki maintained this strength through September 10 as it continued on its west-northwest course. On that day, the typhoon again entered a region of weak steering currents between two anticyclones within the subtropical ridge. A trough approaching from the west was forecast to prompt Uleki to turn east; however, the typhoon maintained a general northwest motion in a stair-stepped fashion. Increasing wind shear and cooler air soon imparted weakening, and Uleki degraded to a tropical storm by September 12.

Continued effects from shear stripped the cyclone of all deep convection and by September 14 only a band of cirrus clouds remained in association with Uleki. The JTWC issued their final warning on the system at 00:00 UTC that day accordingly. The JMA maintained the system as a tropical depression as the former typhoon began turning to the east. Uleki later transitioned into an extratropical cyclone on September 16 as it accelerated to the east. The system dissipated the following day near the International Date Line, far from any major landmasses.

=== Typhoon Hal ===
- Very strong typhoon (JMA)
- Category 3 typhoon (SSHWS)
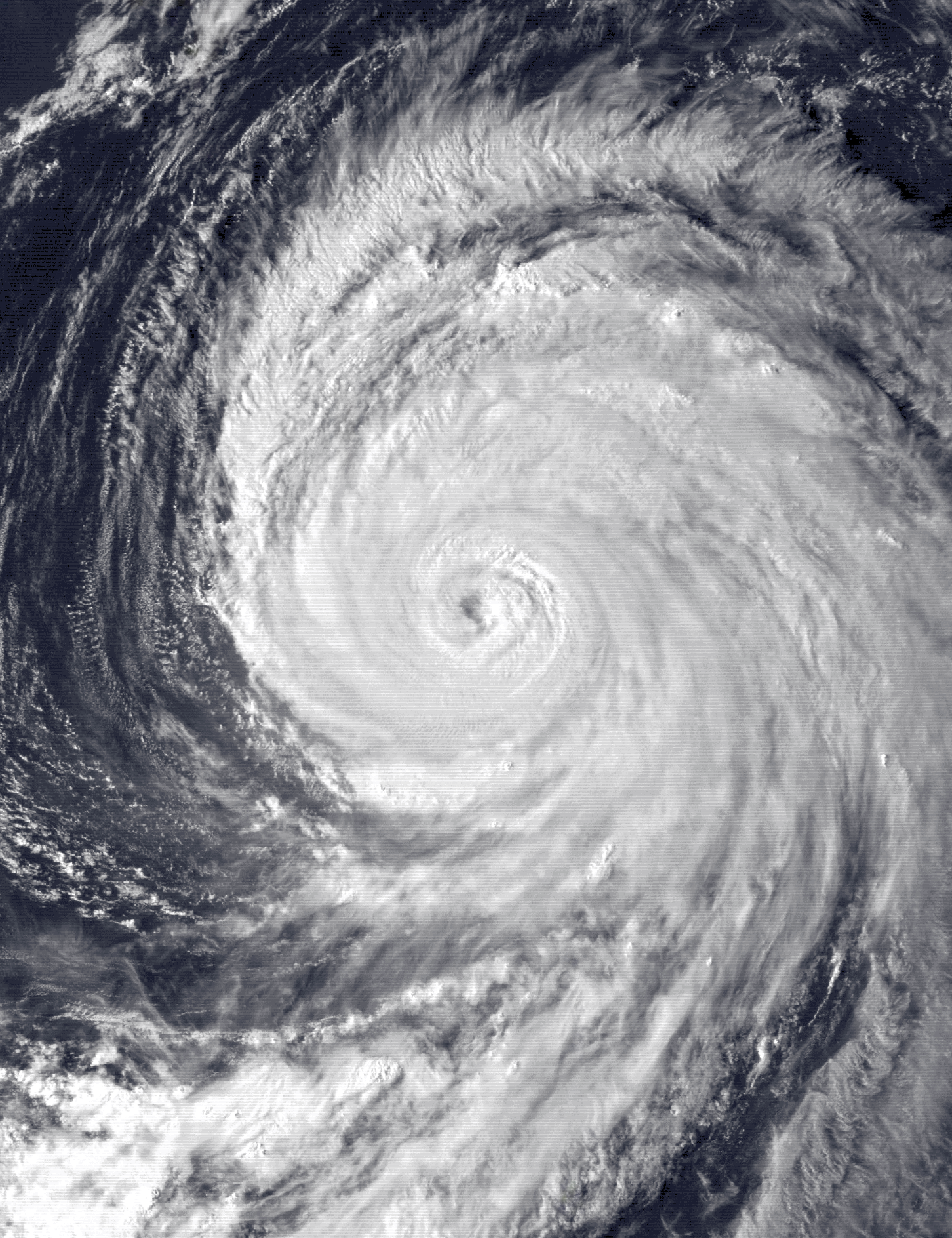
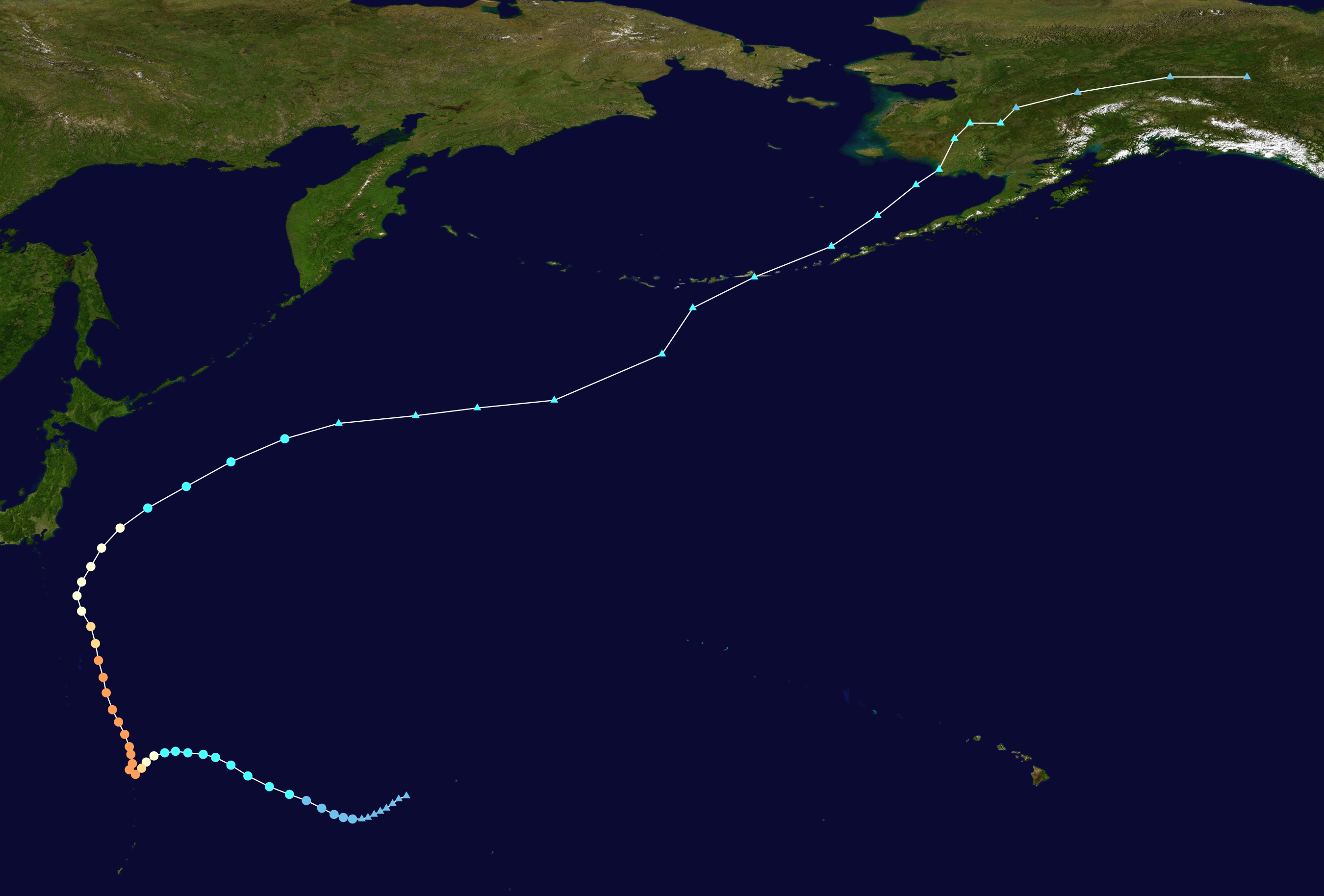
- Duration: September 8 – September 17
- Peak intensity: 155 km/h (100 mph) (10-min); 945 hPa (mbar)

An area of disturbed weather developed to the west of Wake Island. Over the next two days, Hal slowly organized as it tracked westward, with both the JTWC and JMA declaring the disturbance a tropical depression on September 8 well to the southeast of Japan. Moving to the northwest, Hal intensified into a tropical storm on September 9, according to both the JTWC and JMA, and then turned to the southeast on September 10. The JTWC declared Hal a typhoon that day, with the JMA following suit the following day. Midday on September 11, Hal attained peak intensity. There was significant difference between the two agencies, however, as the JTWC reported winds of 195 km/h (120 mph) and the JMA estimated winds of 130 km/h (80 mph). Early on September 12, Hal sharply recurved, first turning to the north-northwest and eventually northeast on September 15. Accelerating northeastward, Hal became an extratropical cyclone on September 17, and the JMA stopped tracking it the next day. As an extratropical cyclone, Hal restrengthened before moving through the eastern Bering Sea on September 19 and into Alaska on September 20. The weakening low moved on an anticyclonic path through southern Alaska before emerging into the Gulf of Alaska on September 23. The cyclone drifted erratically southward, dissipating in the Gulf of Alaska on September 25.

During its formative stages, Hal brought winds of up to 70 km/h (45 mph) to Guam, which caused minor property damage and scattered power outages.

=== Severe Tropical Storm Irma ===
- Severe tropical storm (JMA)
- Tropical storm (SSHWS)
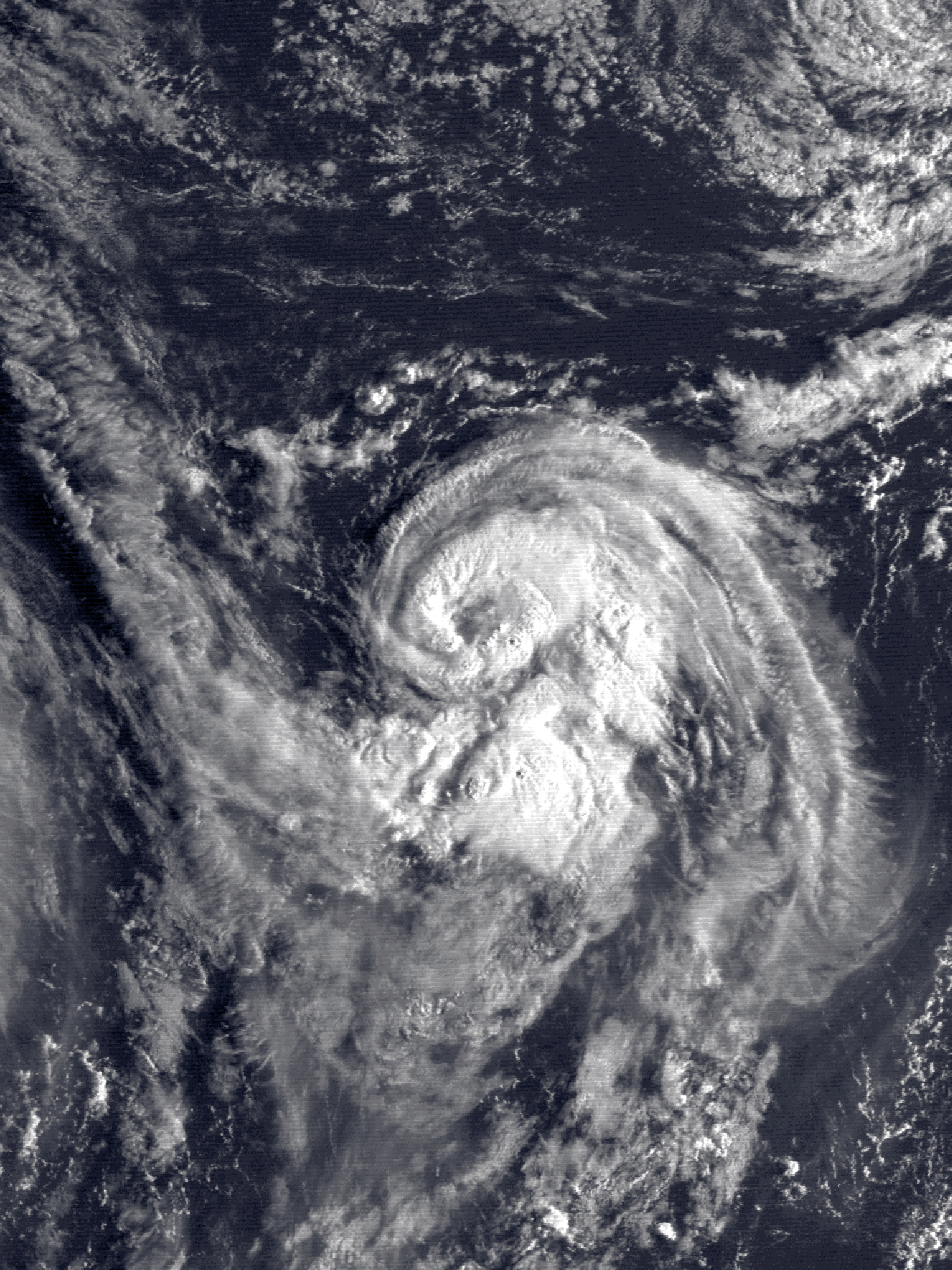
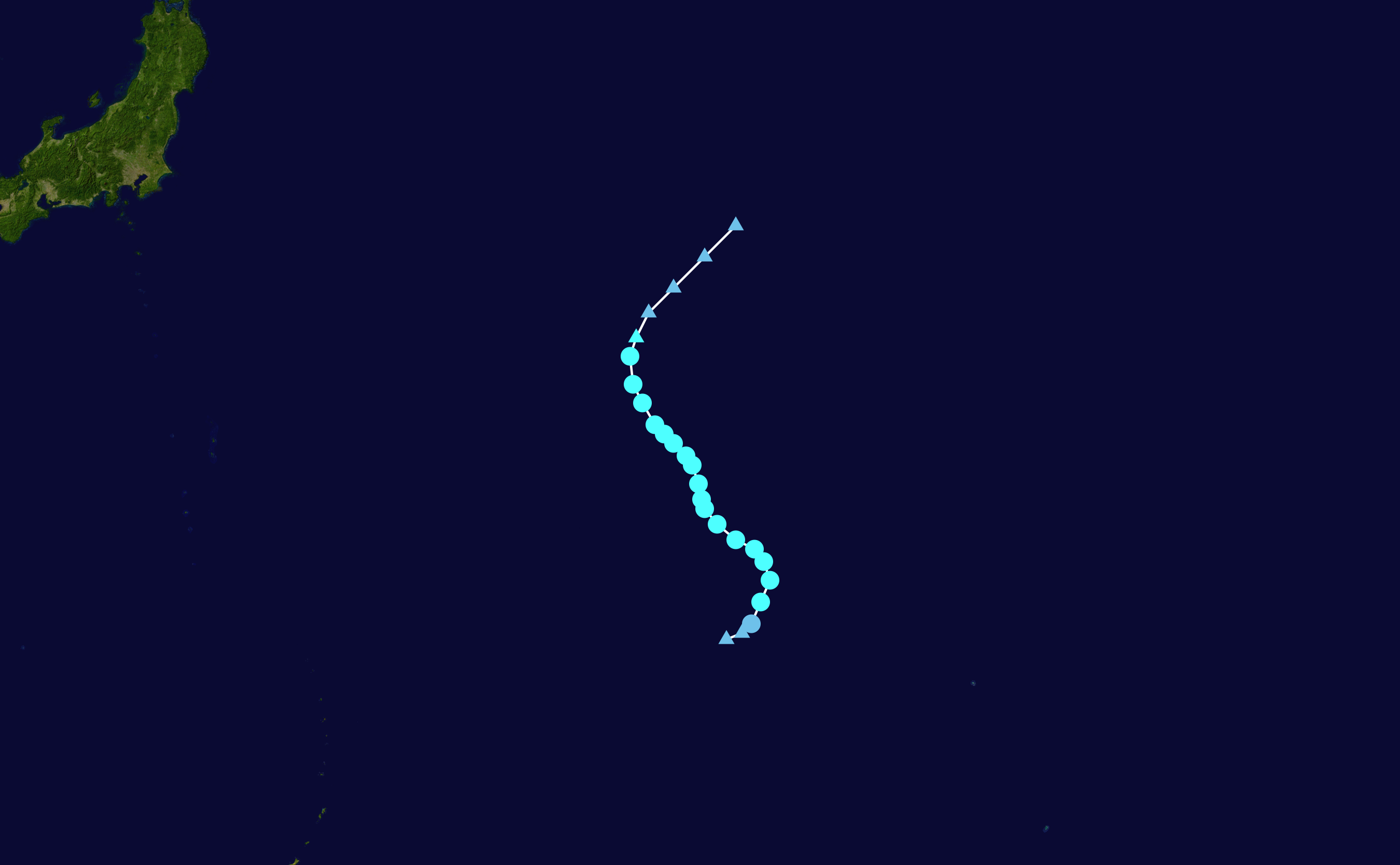
- Duration: September 11 – September 17
- Peak intensity: 100 km/h (65 mph) (10-min); 990 hPa (mbar)

Part of a mid-September tropical cyclone outbreak, Tropical Storm Irma originated from an area of disturbed weather developed on September 11. The same day, an increase in convection prompted the JTWC to issue a TCFA while the JMA upgraded it to a tropical depression. Based on objective intensity estimates of 70 km/h (45 mph), the system was classified as a tropical storm by the JTWC and JMA at 00:00 UTC on September 12. Aided by outflow from Typhoon Hal, Irma steadily deepened. Midday on September 13, the JTWC and JMA estimated winds of 105 and 80 km/h (65 and 50 mph). Although data from the JTWC suggested that this was Irma's highest intensity, the JMA increased the intensity of Irma to 105 km/h (65 mph) on September 15. Following Hal northward along a subtropical ridge, Irma slowly weakened, and later on September 15, the JTWC issued its last warning. A little over 24 hours later, the JMA ceased keeping an eye on Irma.

=== Tropical Storm Jeff (Lusing) ===
- Tropical storm (JMA)
- Tropical storm (SSHWS)
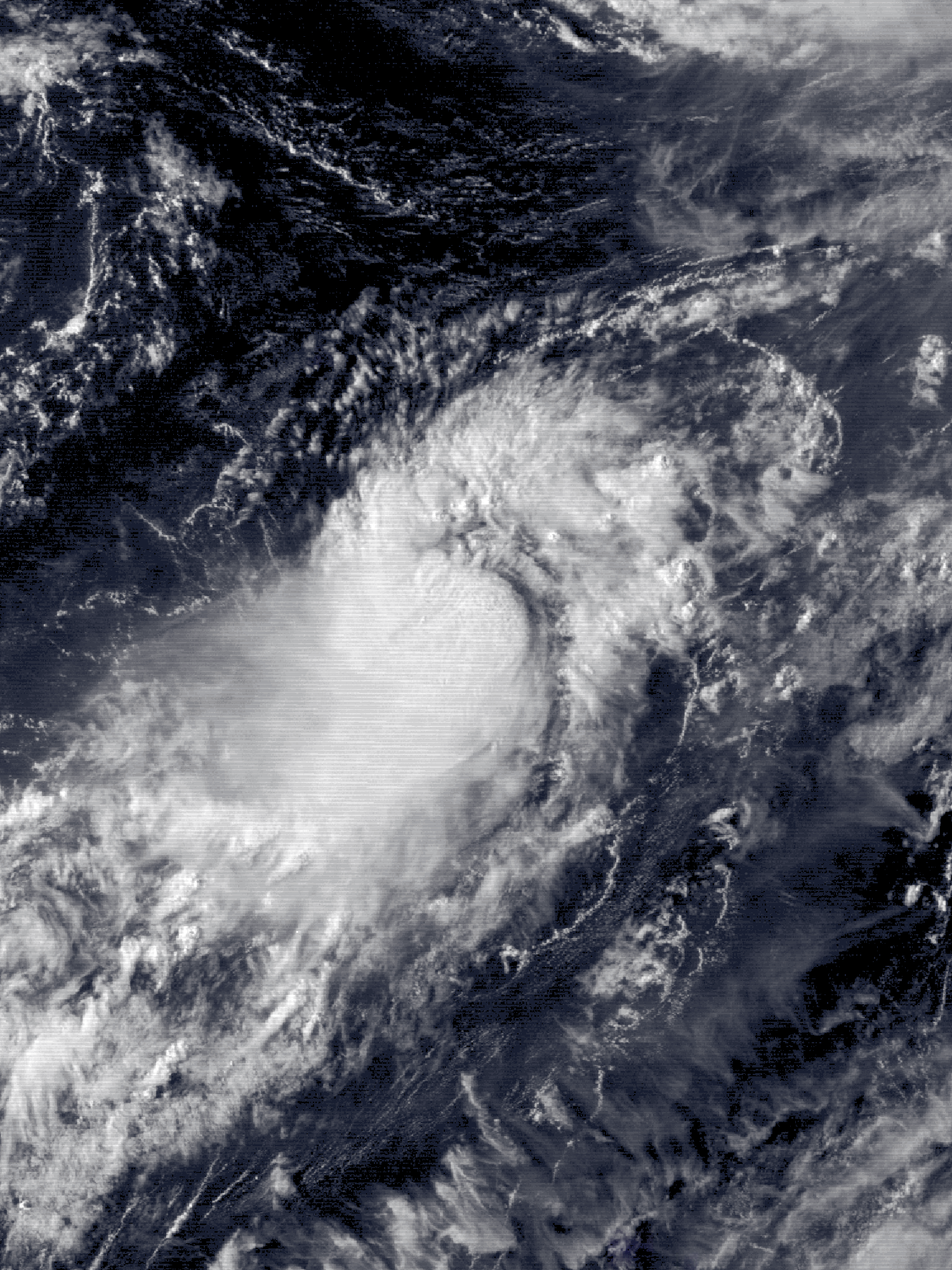
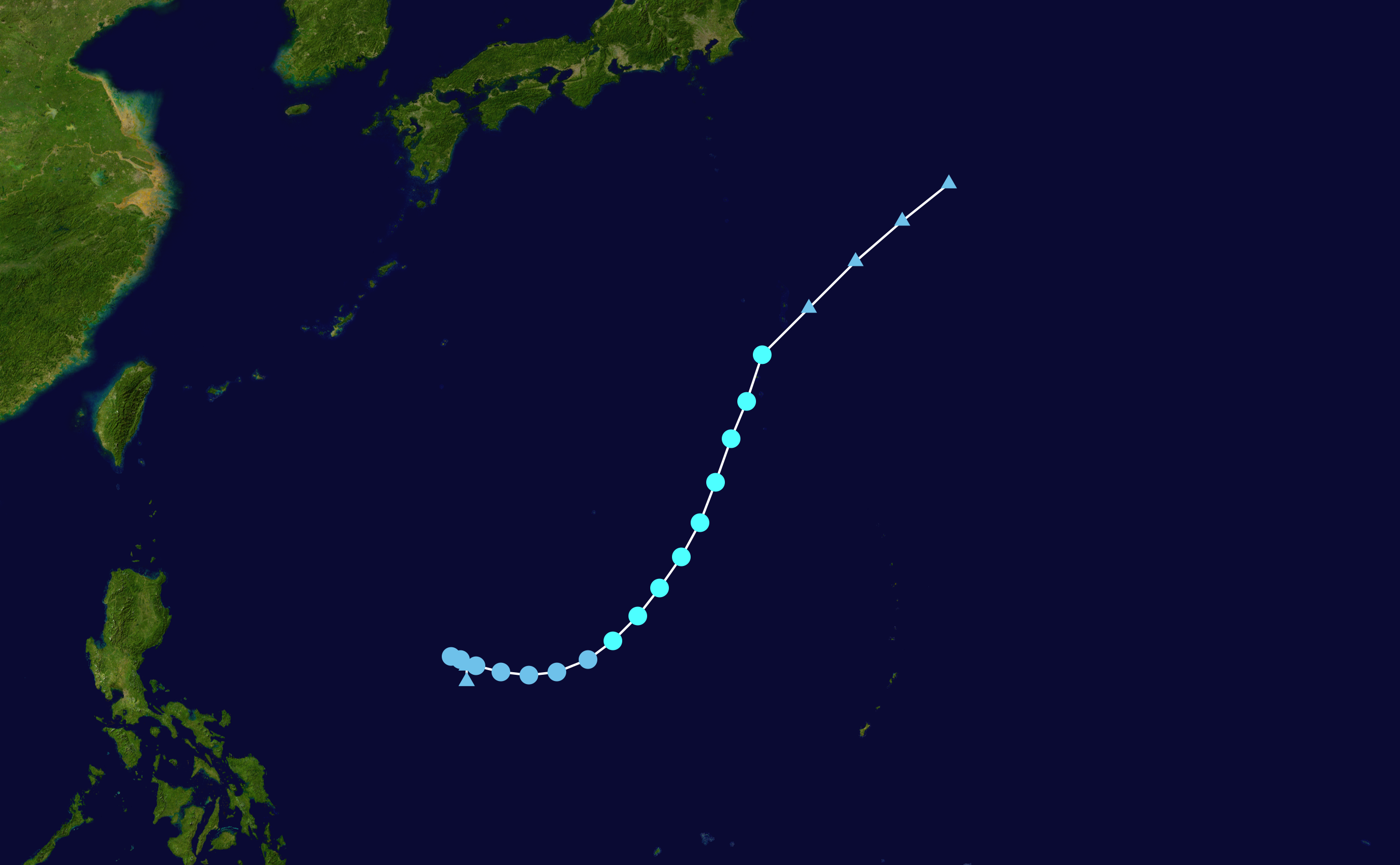
- Duration: September 11 – September 17
- Peak intensity: 85 km/h (50 mph) (10-min); 994 hPa (mbar)

A TUTT developed south of a subtropical ridge, which triggered inflow that later resulted in the development in an area of disturbed weather at 00:00 UTC on September 11. Six hours later, the JMA classified the disturbance as a tropical depression, and on September 13, the agency upgraded the depression into a tropical storm. Dvorak estimates of T2.5/40 mph (65 km/h) prompted the JTWC to follow suit the following morning. However, further organization was slow to occur due to strong wind shear caused by Jeff's proximity to Typhoon Hal; all deep convection was restricted to the southern semicircle. On September 14, both the JTWC and JMA agree that Jeff reached its peak intensity of 80 km/h (50 mph). Late on September 15, the JTWC dropped warnings on Jeff. Just over 24 hours later, the JMA stopped tracking it as well.

=== Severe Tropical Storm Kit (Maring) ===
- Severe tropical storm (JMA)
- Tropical storm (SSHWS)
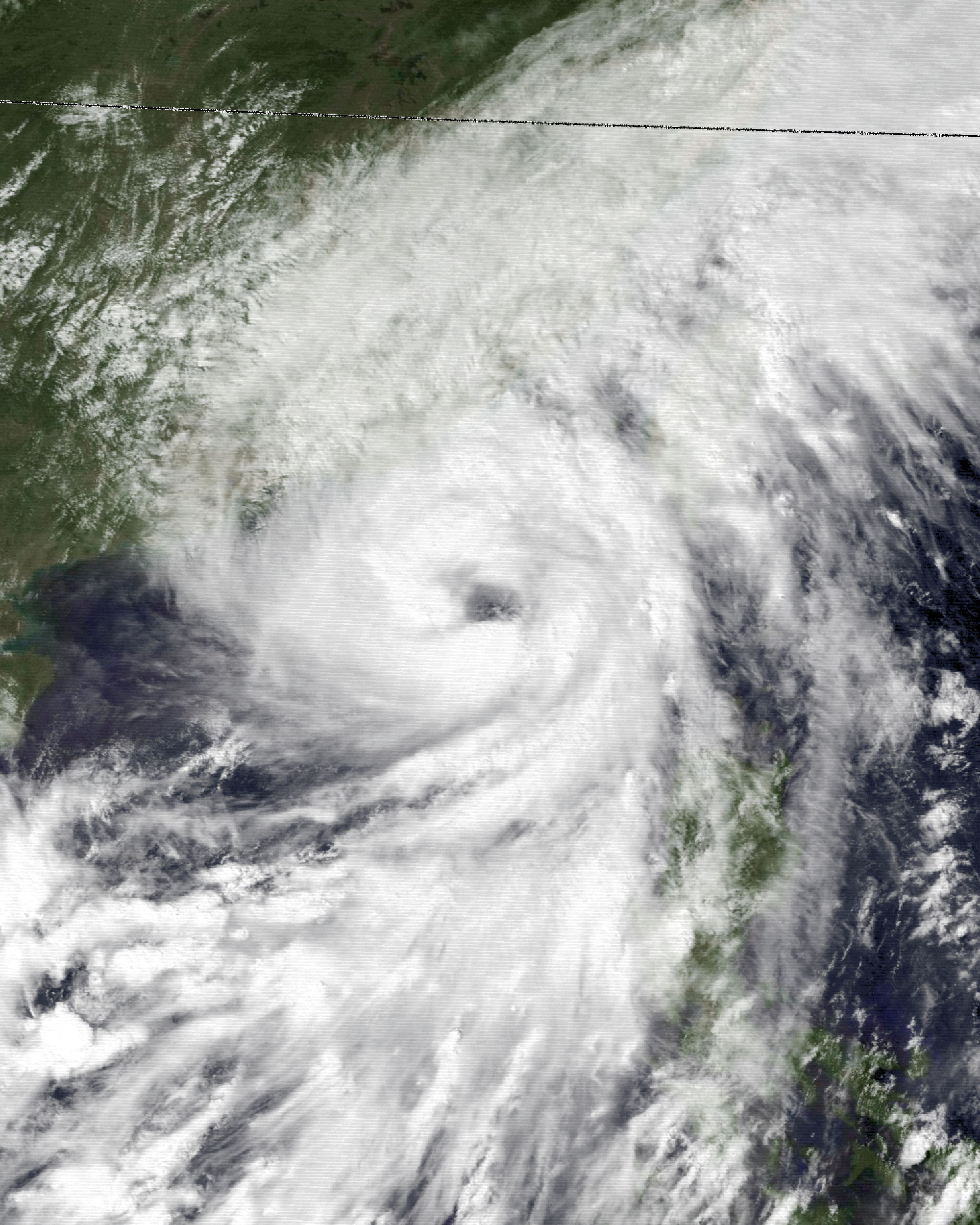
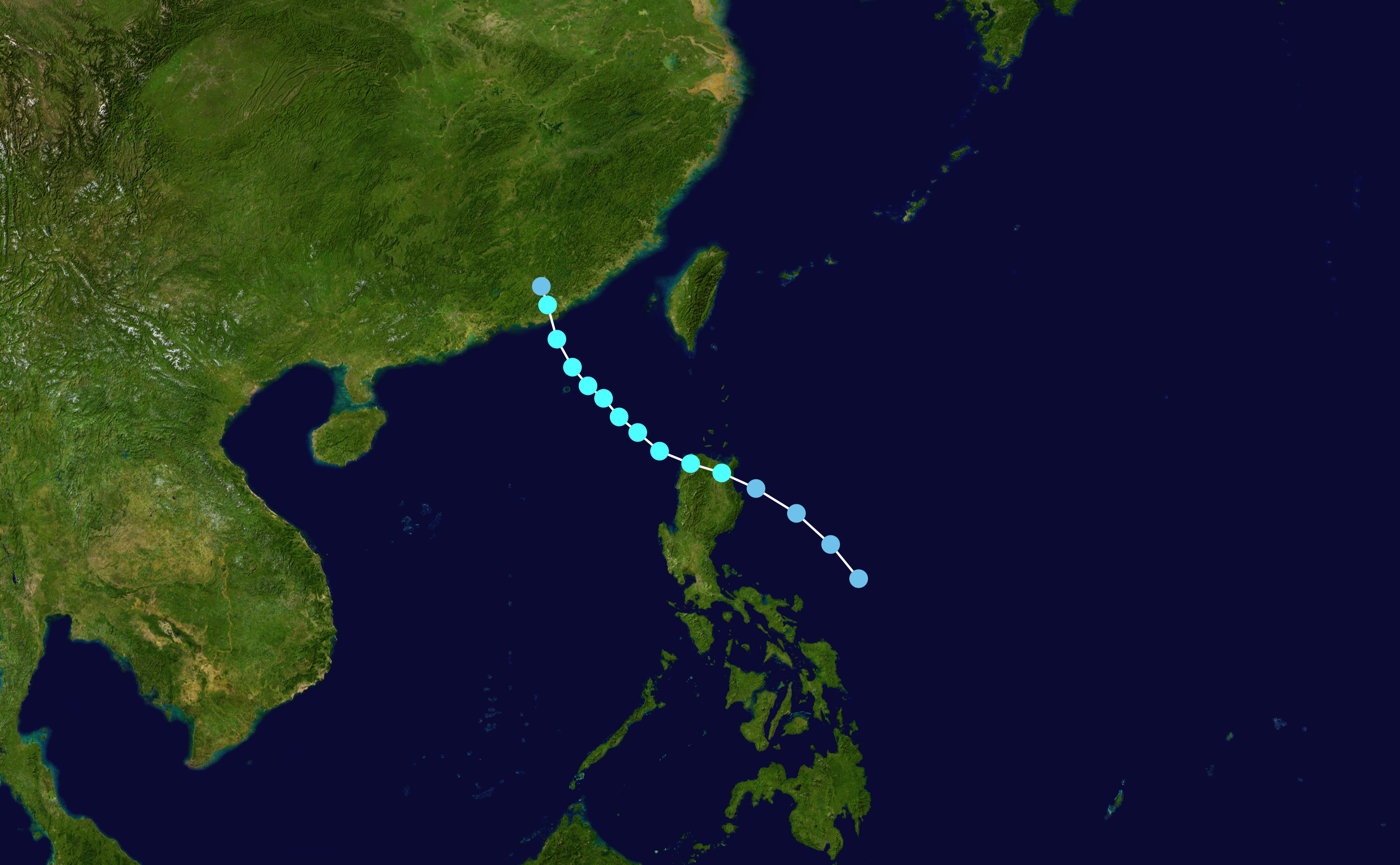
- Duration: September 19 – September 22
- Peak intensity: 100 km/h (65 mph) (10-min); 980 hPa (mbar)

An eastward extension of the monsoon trough resulted in an area of disturbed weather around 560 km (350 mi) east of Manila on September 18. A combination of increased convection, enhanced outflow aloft, and a Dvorak estimate of T2.0/55 km/h (35 mph) resulted in the JTWc upgraded the disturbance into a tropical depression; the JMA followed suit around this time. Even though the depression tracked westward over Luzon, the depression gradually intensified, and at 18:00 UTC on September 19, the JTWC upgraded Kit into a tropical storm. Eighteen hours later, the JMA did the same, making Kit the sixth out of eight tropical storm that month. Tracking over the open waters of the South China Sea, an expansion of the storm's southwesterly outflow channel promoted further intensification. On the morning of September 21, both the JTWC and JMA reported that Kit attained peak intensity of 115 and 105 km/h (70 and 65 mph) respectively. On September 22, the storm made landfall along the 250 km (155 mi) northeast of Hong Kong; at the time of landfall, the JMA estimated winds of 80 km/h (50 mph). Several hours later, the JMA ceased following the cyclone.

According to press reports, torrential rain occurred near Shantou, where Kit moved ashore. Eight people were killed and over one hundred were injured. About 182,860 acres (74,000 ha) of farmland were inundated. More than 24,000 houses were damaged and 759 houses collapsed. Forty boats, one bridge, and several river embankments were also damaged. The total damage in the area was estimated at a little over US$35.1 million. (Note: Some currencies are converted to Chinese Yuan to United States Dollars using this with an exchange rate of the year 1988.) In Fujian Province, heavy rain due to the remnants of Kit and Mamie resulted in nine lives lost, with an addition 51,000 losing their homes. About 26,000 ha (64,245 acres) of farmland were inundated and over 1,200 houses were destroyed.

=== Severe Tropical Storm Lee (Ningning) ===
- Severe tropical storm (JMA)
- Tropical storm (SSHWS)
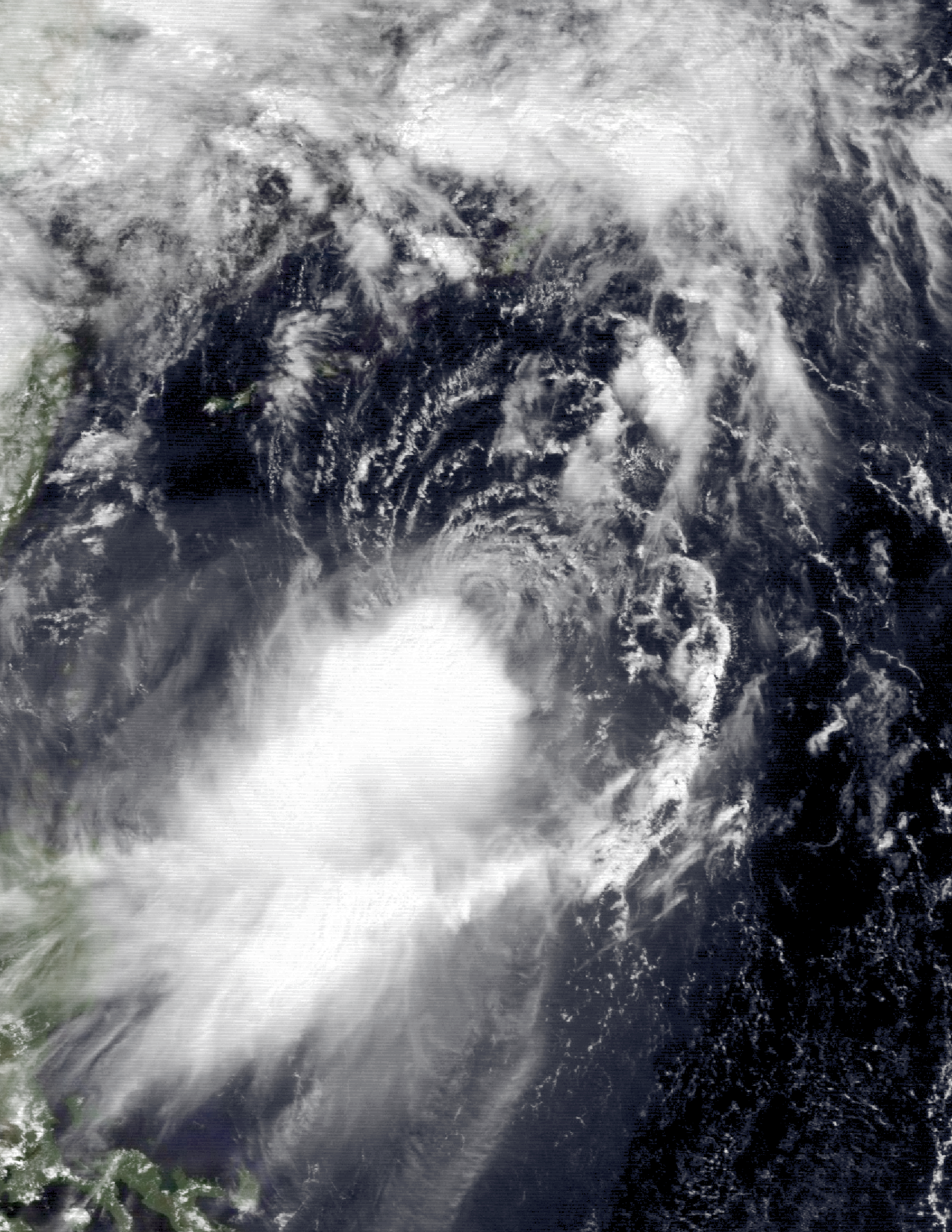
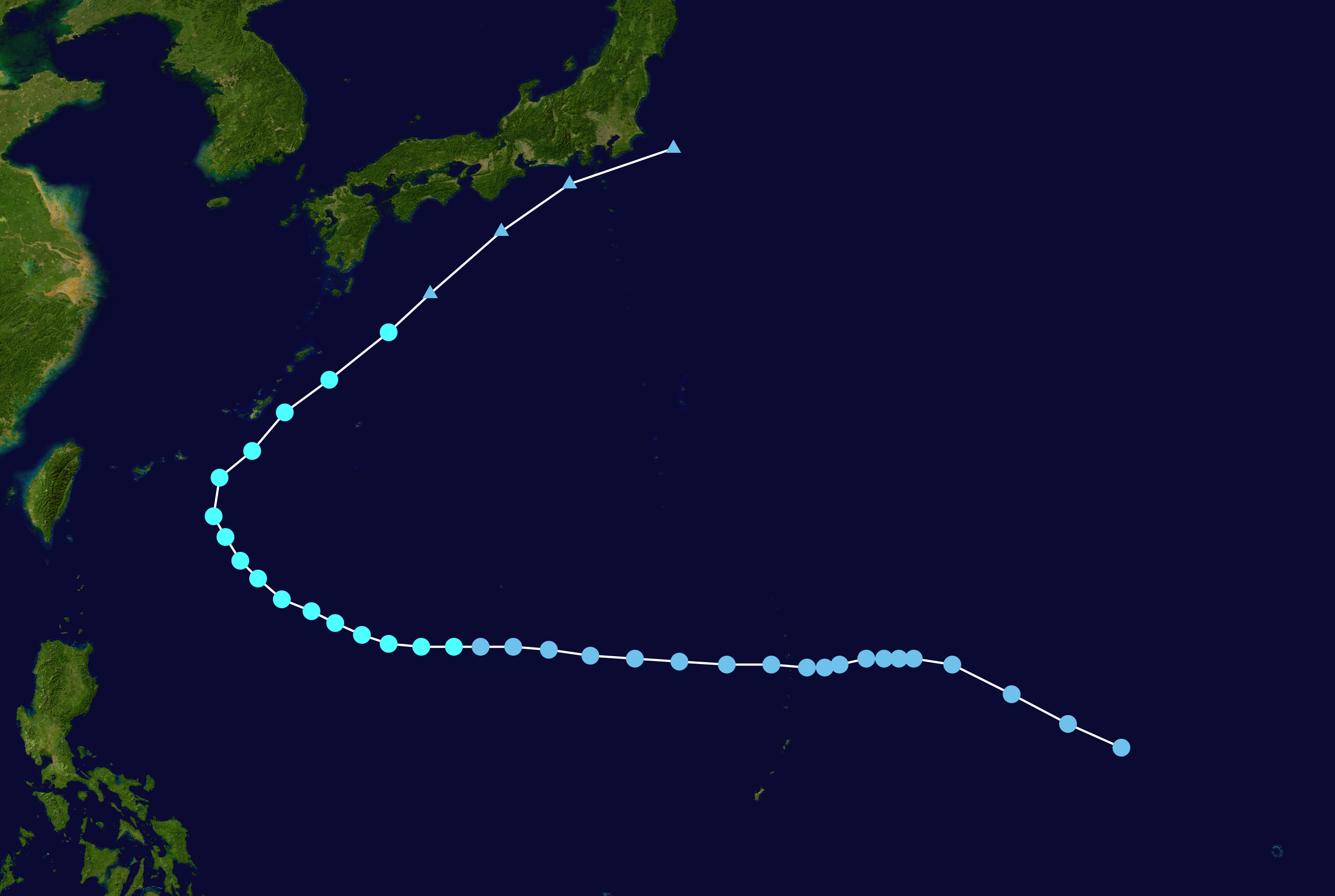
- Duration: September 19 – September 25
- Peak intensity: 95 km/h (60 mph) (10-min); 990 hPa (mbar)

On September 16, an area of disturbed weather spawned by a TUTT cell developed near the dateline. The disturbance traced westward over the next four days without organized appreciably, although the JMA did classify it as a tropical depression. Improved organization prompted the JTWC to issue a TCFA on September 20, and satellite intensity estimated led to the JTWC and JMA classifying the system as Tropical Storm Lee. The tropical storm headed west-northwest south of the subtropical ridge, and later that day, the JTWC and JMA reported that Lee attained its peak intensity of 105 and 80 km/h (65 and 50 mph). On September 23, satellite images showed a partially exposed low-level center, which resulted in weakening. Although initially forecast by the JTWC to follow Kit into southern China. Instead, Lee recurved to the east of Okinawa. Lee transitioned to an extratropical cyclone on September 24 as it continued tracking northeastward.

=== Tropical Storm Mamie ===
- Tropical storm (JMA)
- Tropical storm (SSHWS)
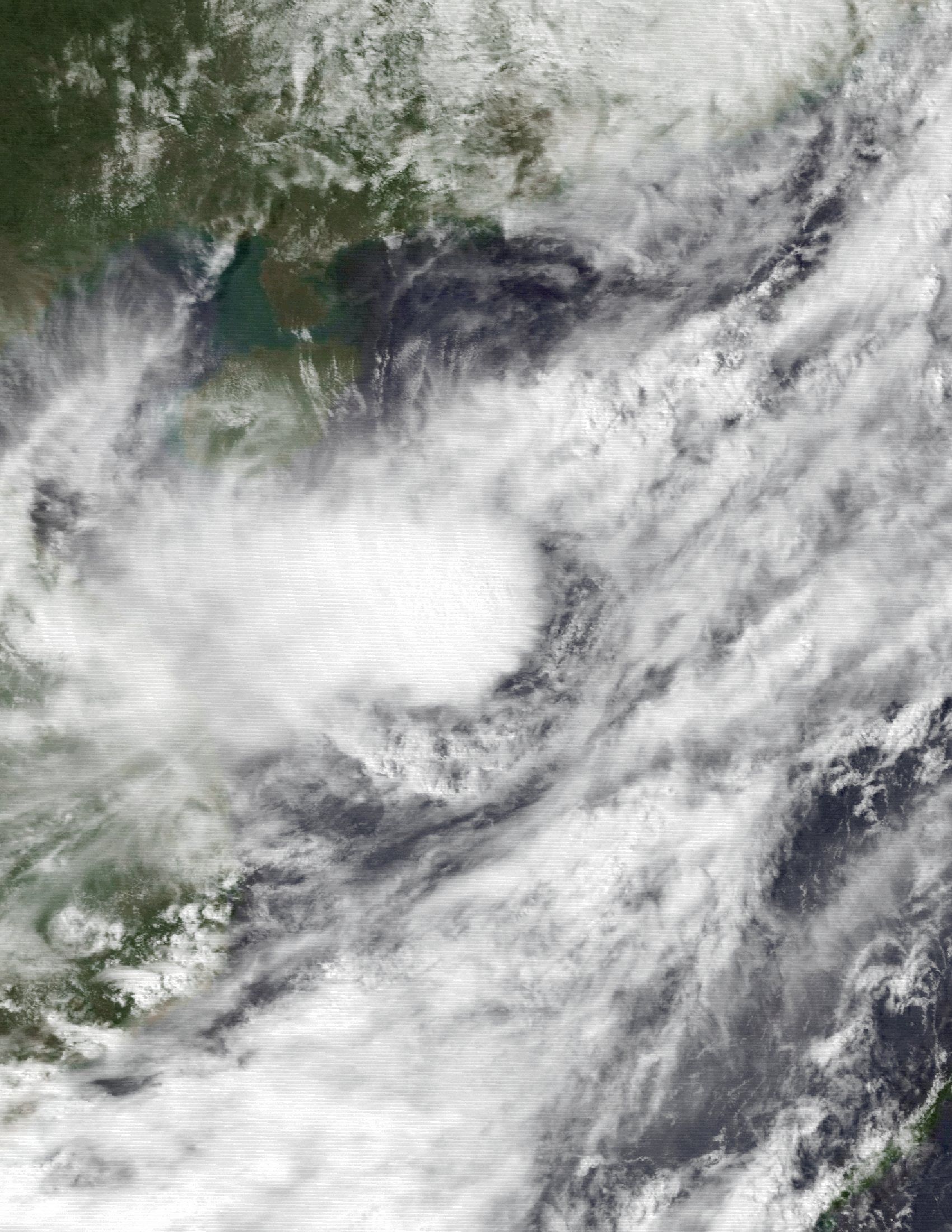
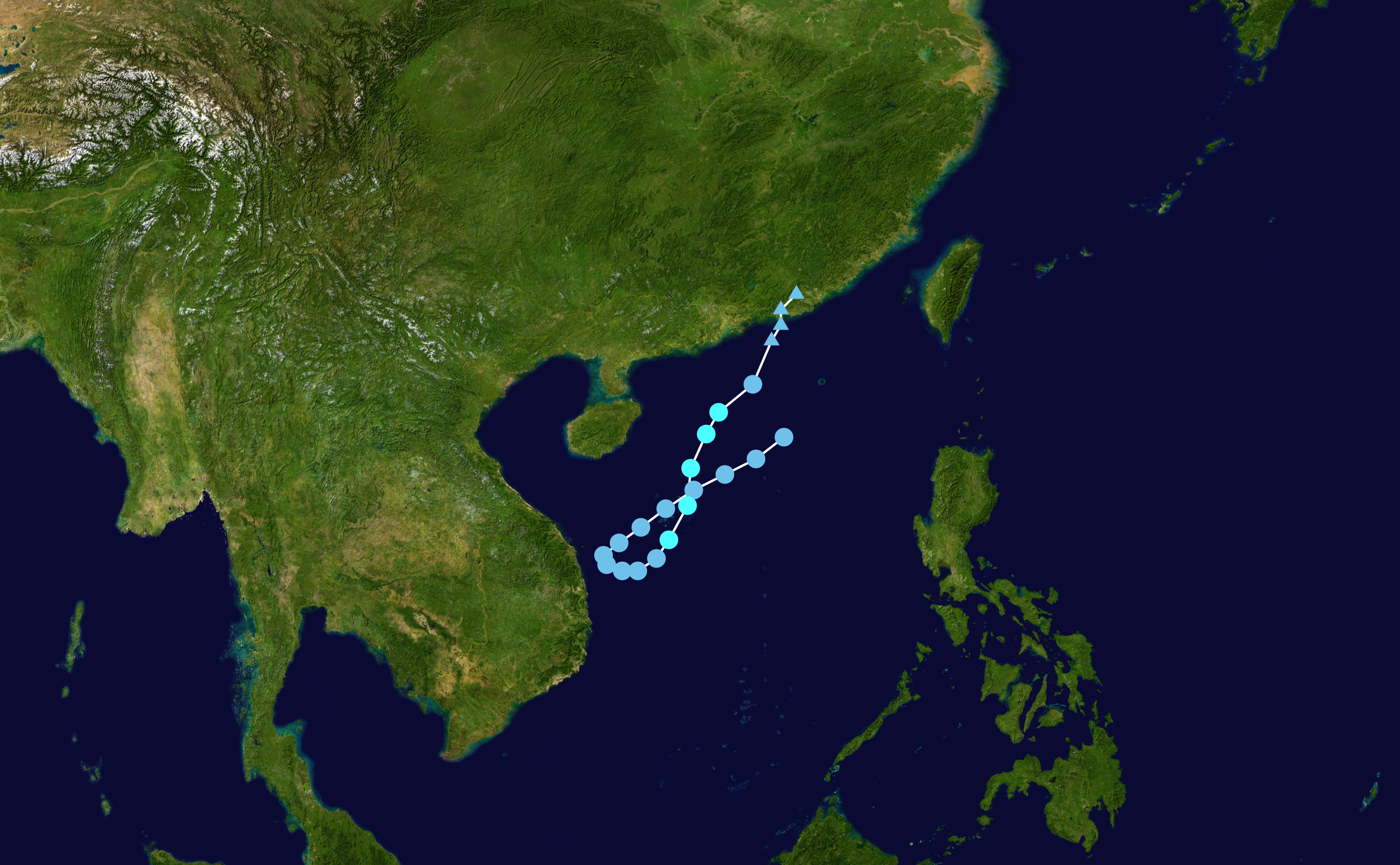
- Duration: September 19 – September 24
- Peak intensity: 85 km/h (50 mph) (10-min); 990 hPa (mbar)

The second tropical cyclone of 1988 to develop in the South China Sea, Tropical Storm Mamie formed from the same extension of the monsoon trough that spawned Tropical Storm Kit. An area of disturbed weather developed on September 19. On the same day, the system was upgraded into a tropical depression by the JMA and due to a binary interaction with Kit, tracked southwestward. After veering east, the disturbance turned northeastward due to a trough. Late on September 21, the JMA upgraded the depression into a tropical storm, with the JMA also estimated that Kit attained its peak intensity of 80 km/h (50 mph) at the same time. Based on a pressure report of 991 mbar (29.3 inHg) from a vessel, the JTWC reported that Tropical Storm Mamie developed on the morning of September 22. Increased wind shear took its toll, however, and September 23, the JTWC discontinued warnings on Mamie. However, the JMA did not downgrade Mamie into a tropical depression until 18:00 UTC that day, and did not stop tracking it altogether until September 25. The remnants of the storm later dissipated near Hong Kong. The remnants of the storm, combined with Tropical Storm Kit, later brought flooding to southern China. A total of nine people were killed by the floods.

=== Typhoon Nelson (Paring) ===
- Very strong typhoon (JMA)
- Category 5 super typhoon (SSHWS)
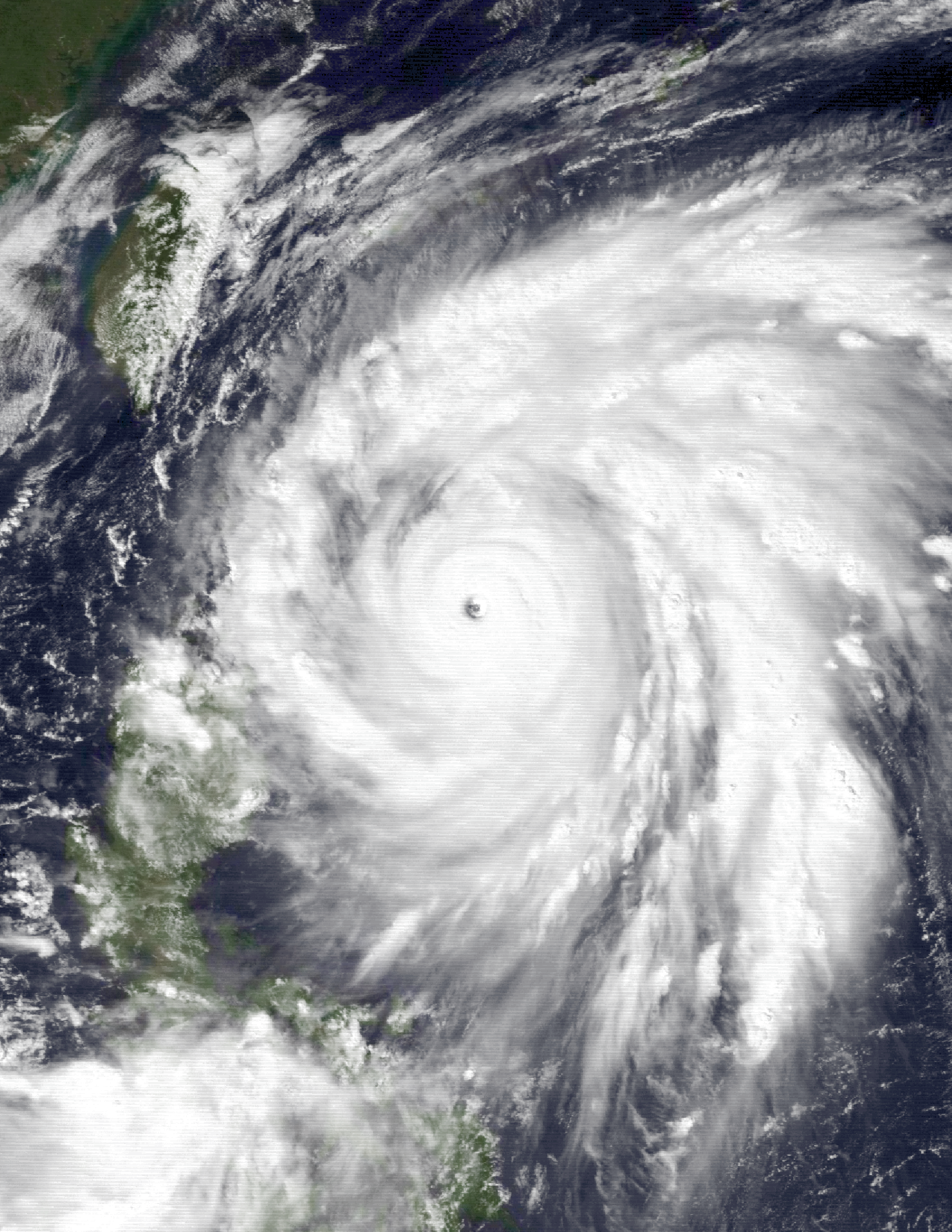
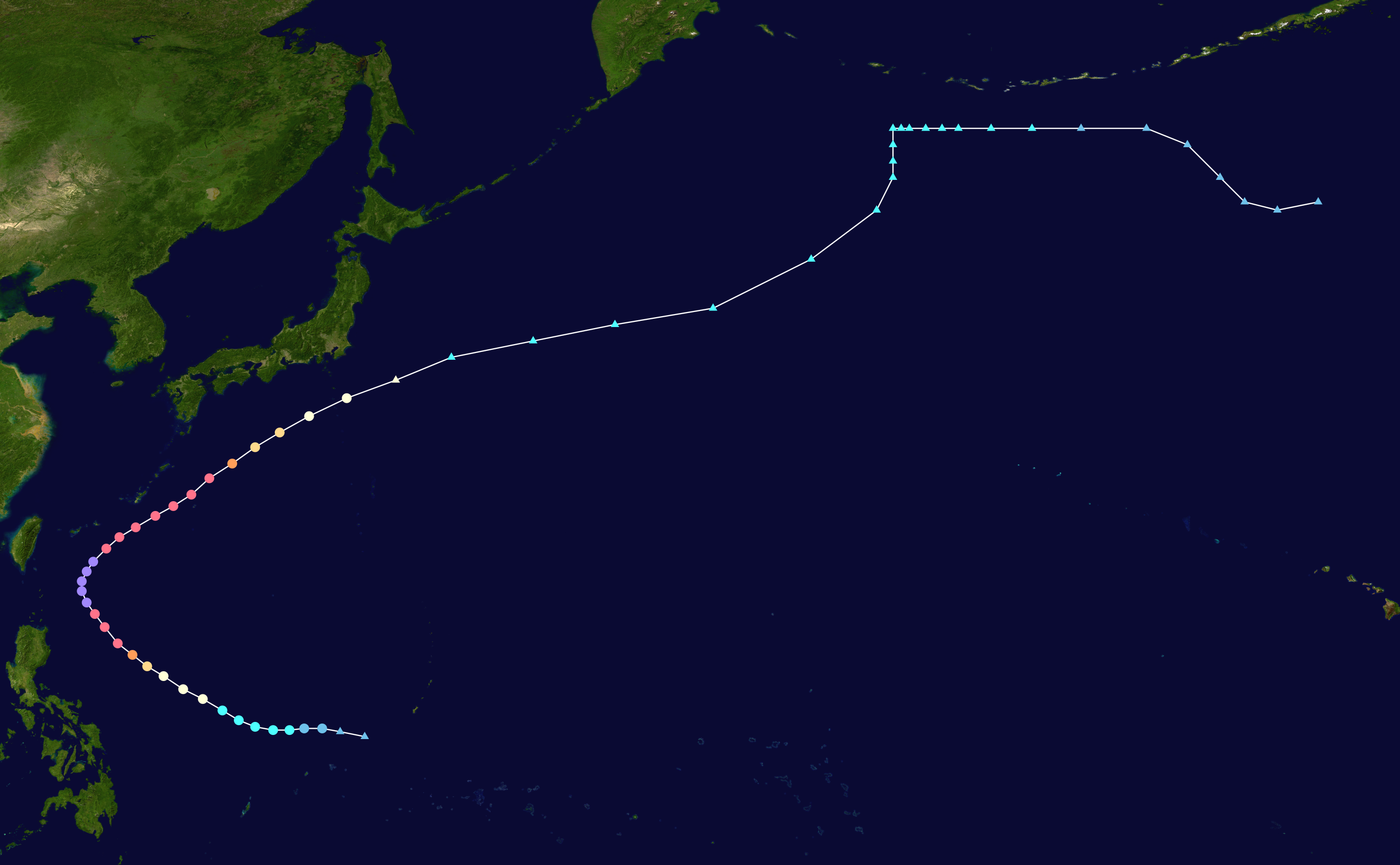
- Duration: September 30 – October 8
- Peak intensity: 185 km/h (115 mph) (10-min); 915 hPa (mbar)

Following a series of tropical cyclone outbreaks, there was a lull in tropical cyclone activity due to the presence of cold, dry air, which caused the monsoon trough to recede south to its climatological position. Within the trough, an area of disturbed weather formed around 380 km (235 mi). The disturbance slowly organized, and on September 30, the JMA upgraded the disturbance into a tropical depression. A dramatic increased in convection resulted in the issuance of a TCFA at 09:00 UTC on October 1. Later that day, both the JTWC and JMA upgraded the system into Tropical Storm Nelson. The newly named storm tracked westward towards the Philippine Islands, and then west-northwestward as it tracked along the periphery of the subtropical ridge. On October 2, the JTWC classified Nelson as a typhoon, and nine hours later, the typhoon began to clear out an eye. On October 3, the JMA upgraded Nelson to a typhoon. The storm subsequently entered a period of rapid deepening, and on October 4, the JTWC declared Nelson a super typhoon. Shortly thereafter, the JTWC estimated peak intensity of 255 km/h (160 mph) while the JMA reported a peak intensity of 185 km/h (115 mph). Not long after its peak, Nelson rounded the western edge of a subtropical ridge and slowly weakened as it accelerated northeast, passing about approximately 155 km (95 mi) southeast of Okinawa, where 212 mm (8.35 in) of rain fell. The typhoon quickly lost deep convection, and on October 8, the JTWC issued its last warning on the system. The next day, the JMA declared Nelson extratropical, although its remnants were still identifiable for a couple more days.

=== JMA Tropical Storm Twenty-five ===
- Tropical storm (JMA)
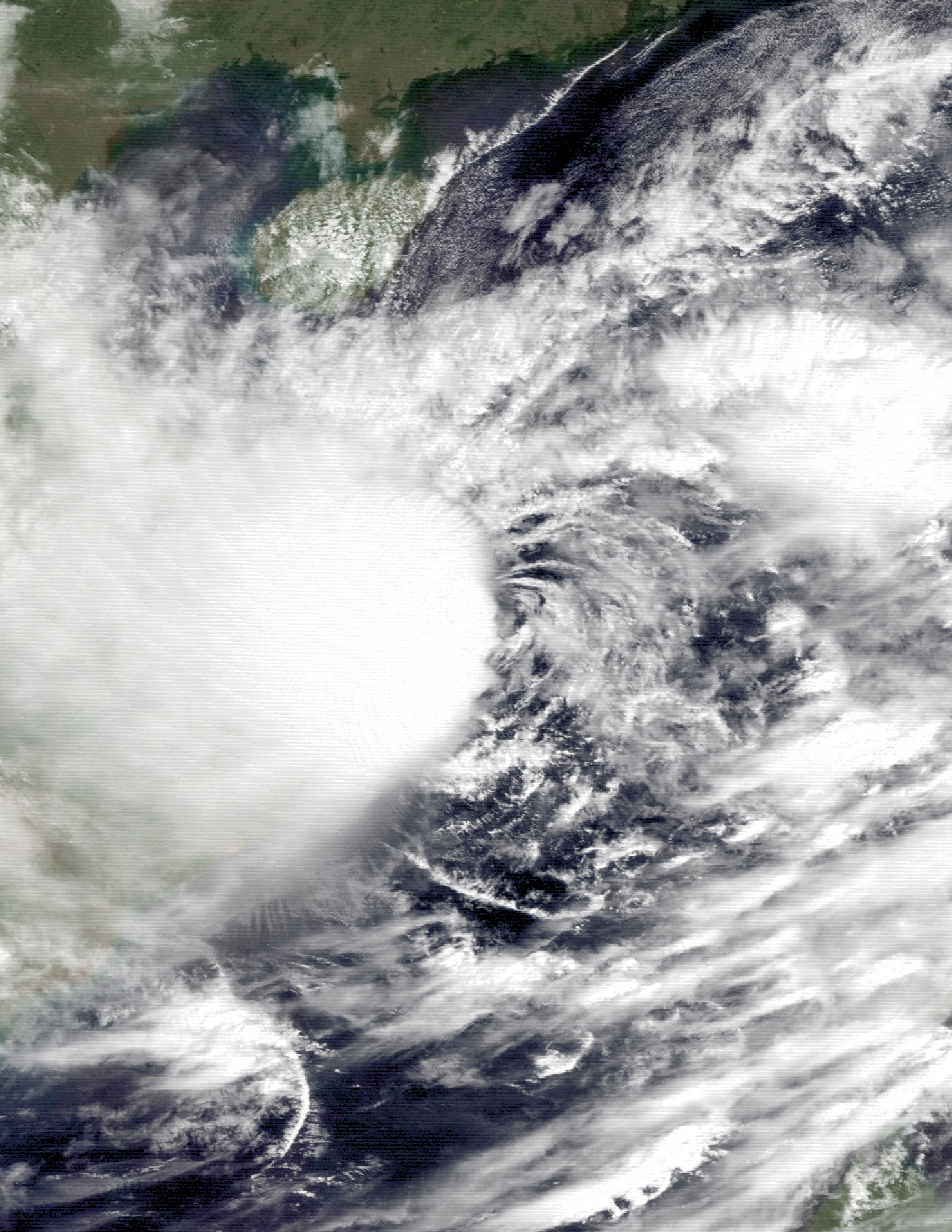
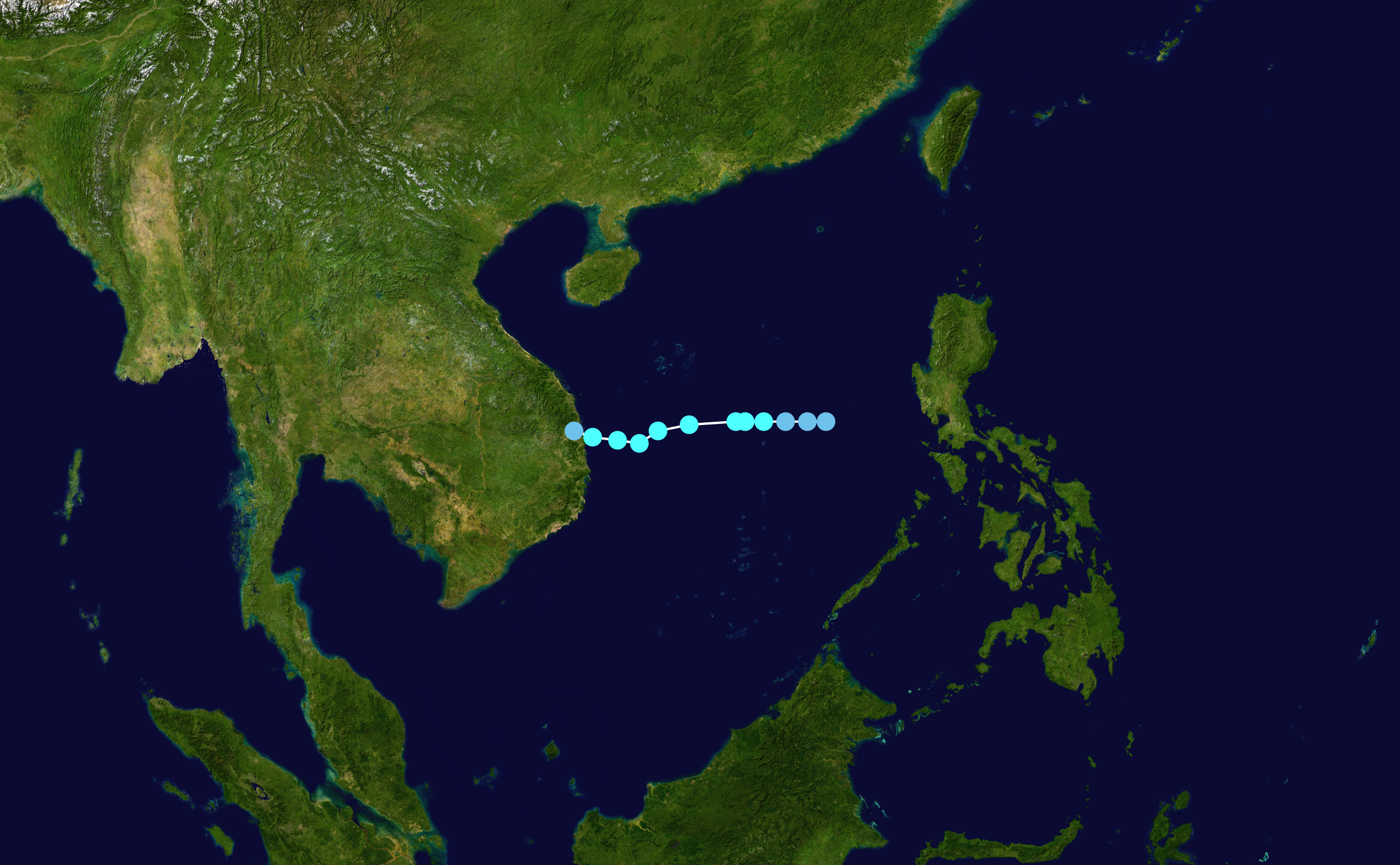
- Duration: October 7 – October 10
- Peak intensity: 85 km/h (50 mph) (10-min); 992 hPa (mbar)

Made landfall in Vietnam and was not monitored by the JTWC.

The remnants of the storm created a wave disturbance, which combined with another tropical depression, intensified the wind convergence in the northern part of the Intertropical Convergence Zone (ITCZ), leading to widespread heavy rainfall over 8 days in the North Central region of Vietnam, with total rainfall exceeding 800mm in some areas. The flooding caused by this rainfall resulted in 103 deaths and 28 missing people.

=== Typhoon Odessa (Seniang) ===
- Typhoon (JMA)
- Category 2 typhoon (SSHWS)
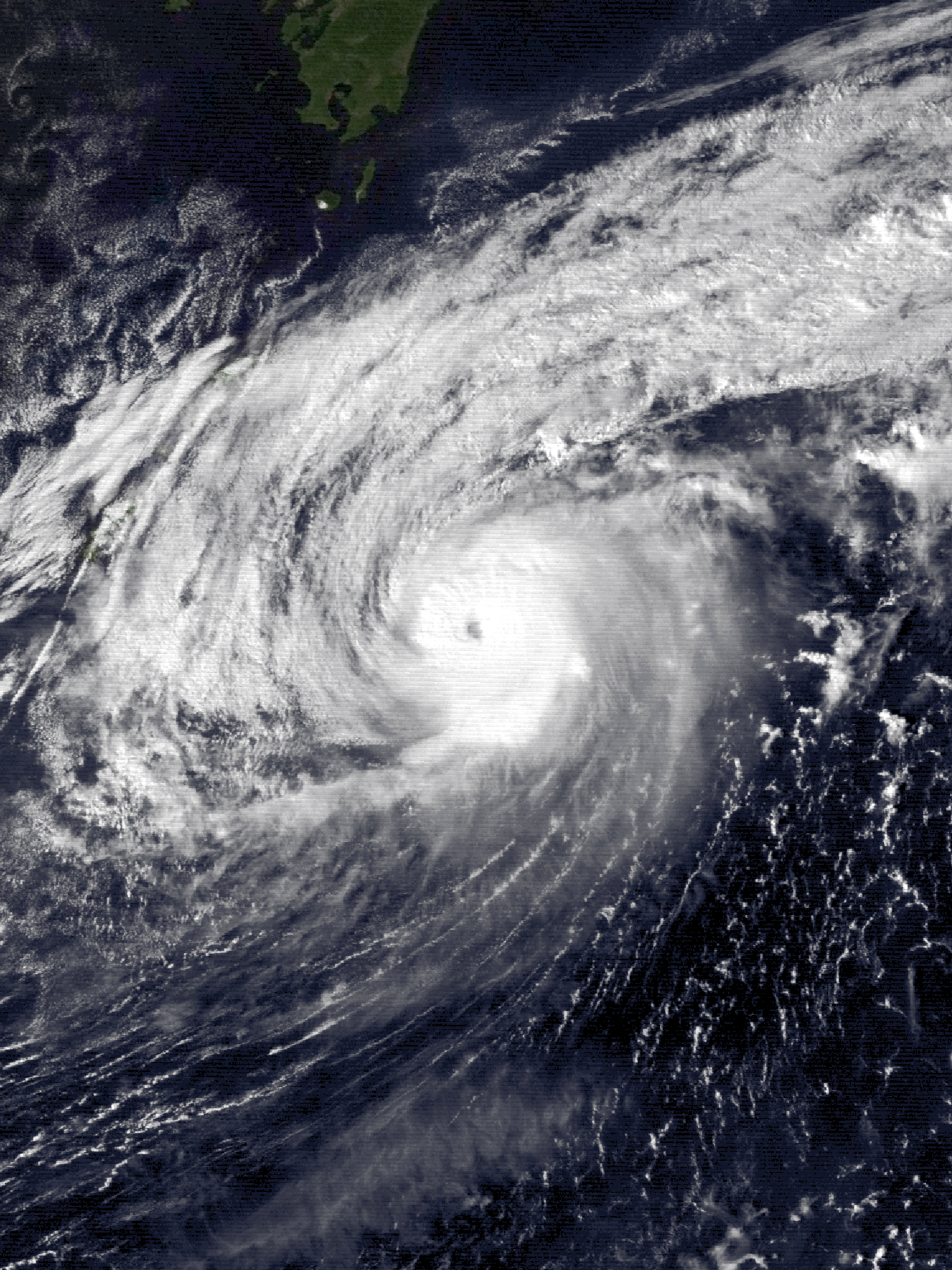
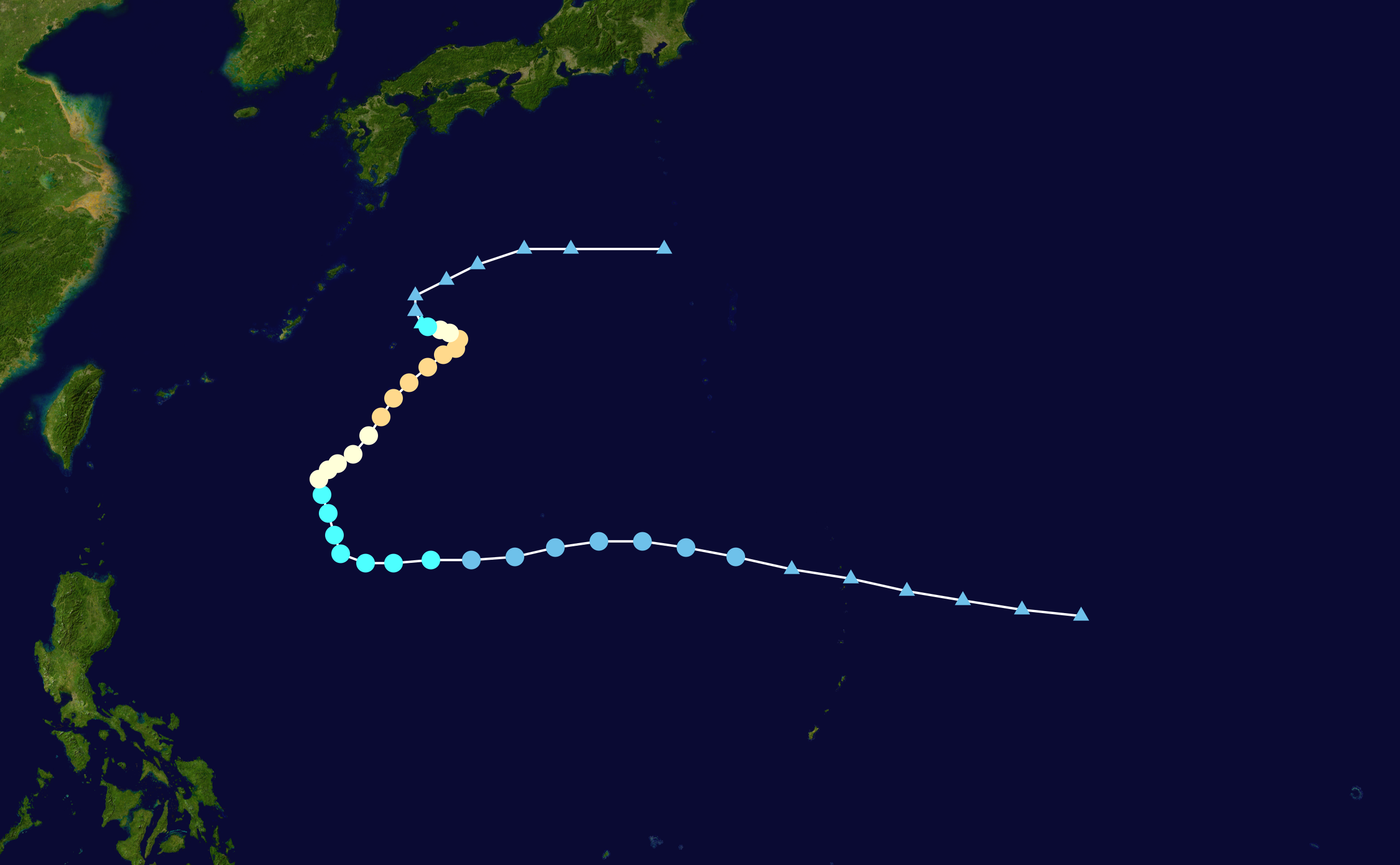
- Duration: October 8 – October 16
- Peak intensity: 130 km/h (80 mph) (10-min); 965 hPa (mbar)

As the previous storm was weakening at high latitudes, a new area of convection formed around 850 km (530 mi) south-southeast of Minami-Tori-shima. Tracking west-northwest, the JMA upgraded the system into a tropical depression on October 9. The next day, the JTWC issued a TCFA. On October 11, the JMA upgraded the depression into a tropical storm, and twelve hours later, satellite intensity estimates prompted the JTWC to follow suit. Cool air aloft aided in intensification as Odessa tracked northwest, and midday on October 12, Odessa was upgraded into a typhoon by the JTWC. Despite forecasts of weakening, the JMA did the same and classified Odessa as a typhoon. A midget typhoon, Odessa continued to intensify, with the JTWC and JMA reporting a peak velocity of 170 and 130 km/h (105 and 80 mph) respectively. Loss of organization followed a transition into an extratropical cyclone, and after the low-level circulation diverged from the deep convection, the JTWC issued the final warning on October 16. The JMA ceased watching the typhoon on October 19.

=== Severe Tropical Storm Pat (Toyang) ===
- Severe tropical storm (JMA)
- Category 1 typhoon (SSHWS)
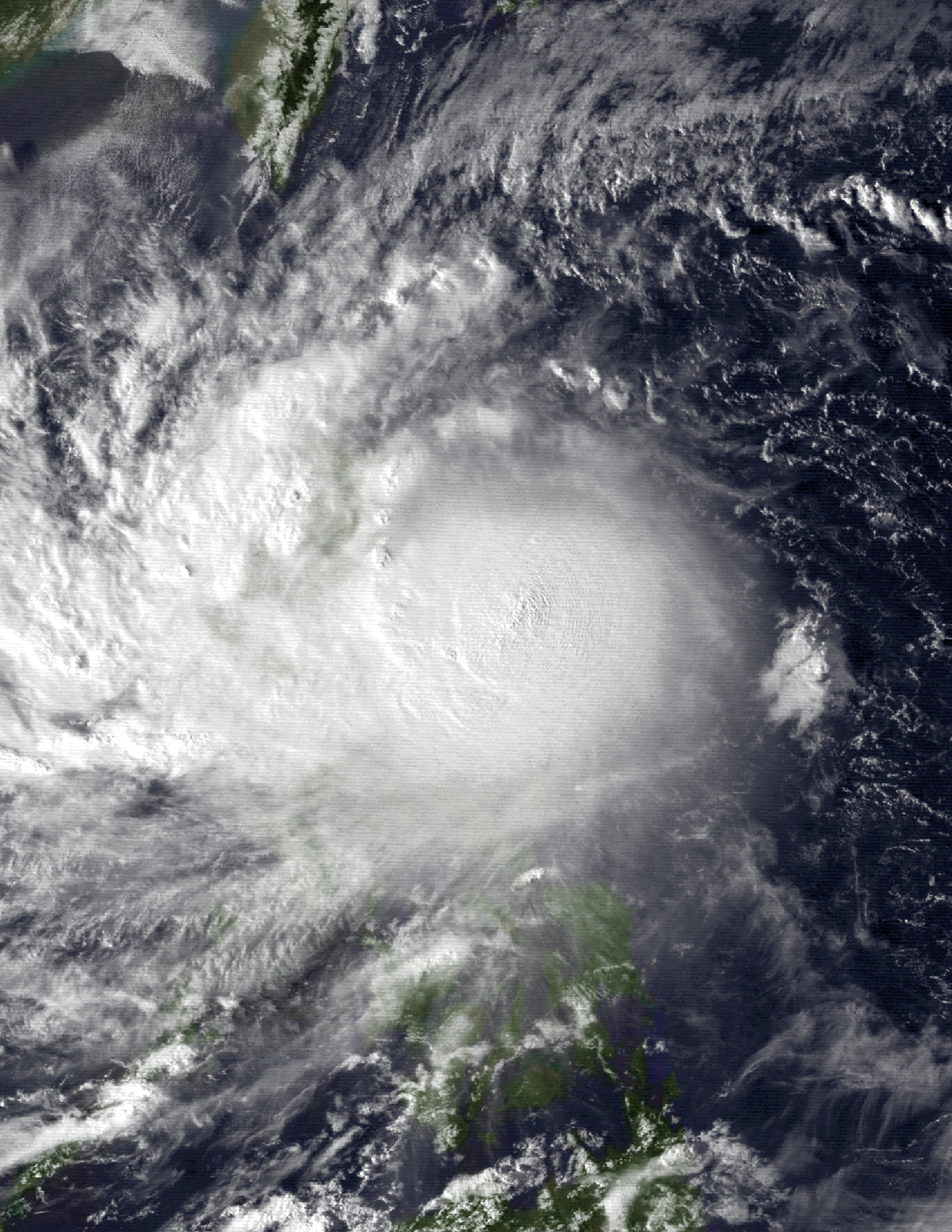
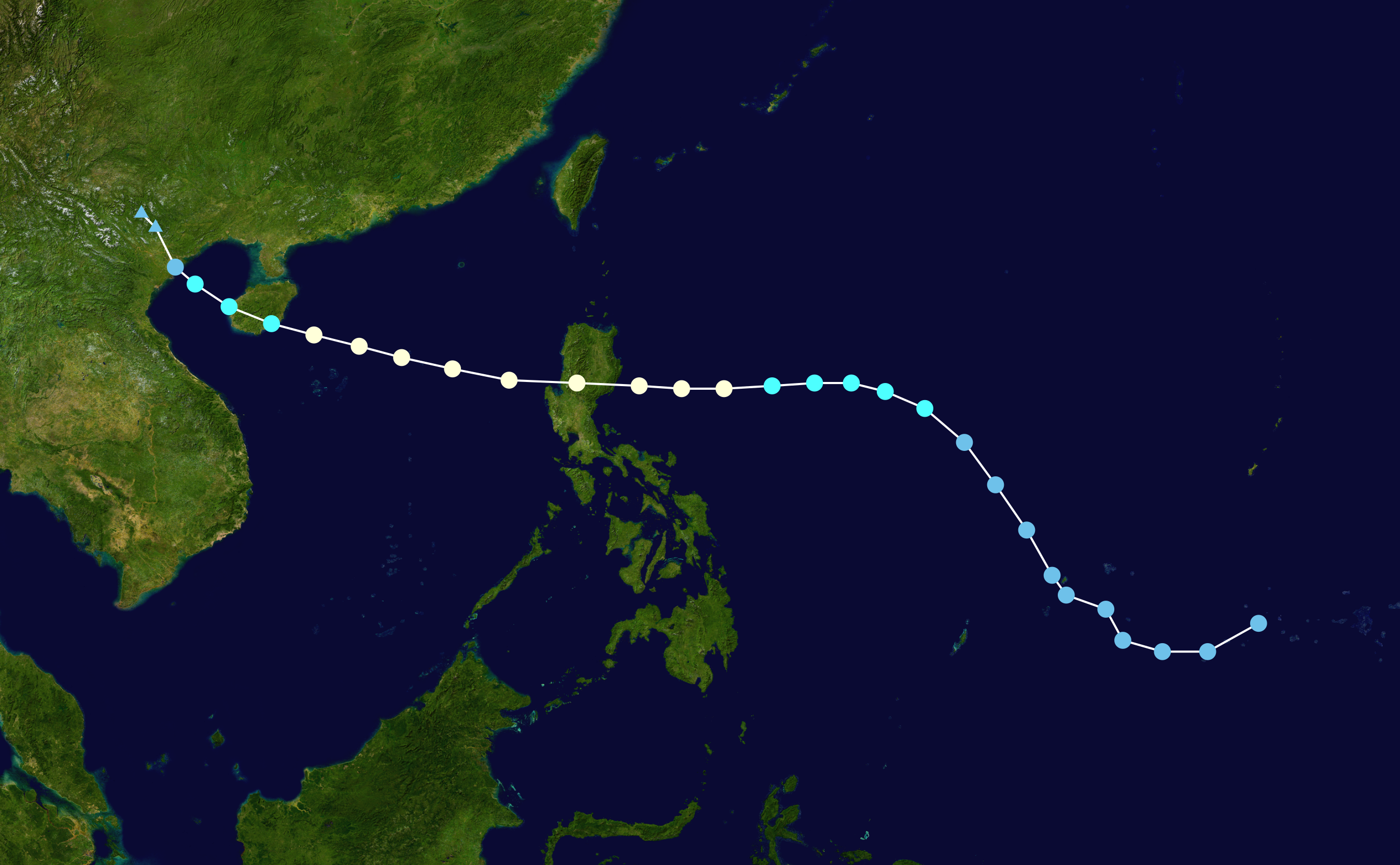
- Duration: October 16 – October 22
- Peak intensity: 110 km/h (70 mph) (10-min); 980 hPa (mbar)

Unlike most systems in 1988, Pat formed from an area of disturbed weather near 10th parallel north that was first noticed by the JTWC on October 16. At 03:00 UTC on October 18, a TCFA was issued. Initially, the system remained poorly organized, with almost all the convection located along the eastern semicircle. Thunderstorm activity associated with the system became more organized, and 15 hours later, the JMA declared it a tropical depression while the JTWC classified the disturbance as Tropical Storm Pat. The storm tracked westward due to a ridge to its north while gradually intensifying, and on October 19, Pat was upgraded into a tropical storm by the JMA. Following an improvement in Pat's substructure, the JTWC upgraded Pat to a typhoon on October 20. Shortly before making landfall on the island of Luzon, the JTWC estimated that the typhoon attained its peak intensity of 135 km/h (85 mph). According to the JTWC, Pat crossed central Luzon while remaining a typhoon. After Pat entered the South China Sea, the JMA estimated that it attained its maximum intensity of 115 km/h (70 mph) on October 22. Shortly thereafter, Pat began to weaken as it interacted with Hainan. The JTWC estimated that Pat weakened into a tropical storm over the Gulf of Tonkin, and later that day, dissipated slightly onshore Vietnam.

Across Hainan, transport and telephone services were disrupted. About 33,000 ha (81,545 acres) of paddy fields were flooded and 16,000 ha (39,535 acres) of sugar cane were damaged or destroyed. Overall, damage was estimated at US$16 million. In Hong Kong, the storm dropped heavy rainfall for four days. There, a man was killed when one of the containers crushed onto a truck. In another incident, a woman was killed after being hit by a falling flower pot. Elsewhere, a man was injured by a falling tree. Scaffoldings at a construction site collapsed, damaging two automobiles.

According to the HKO, press reports also indicated that Pat and rainstorms associated with a low-pressure area in mid-October left at least 90 people dead and 500,000 homeless in Vietnam. However, according to Vietnam’s official meteorological records, it was not Pat but another tropical storm that, in combination with a low-pressure area active in mid-October, caused widespread heavy rainfall in central Vietnam. Tropical Storm Pat, in fact, did not cause any significant damage in the country.

=== Typhoon Ruby (Unsang) ===
- Typhoon (JMA)
- Category 4 typhoon (SSHWS)
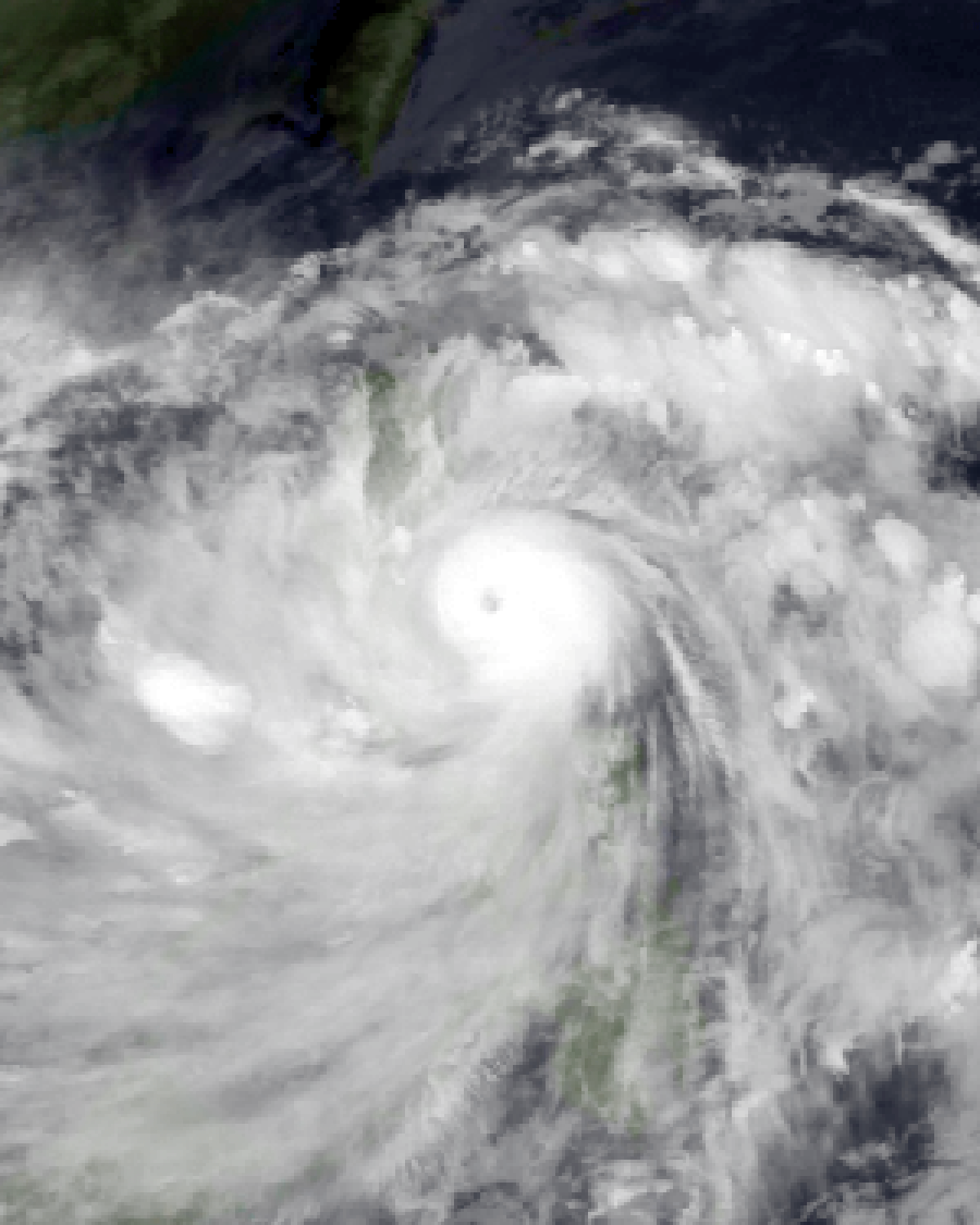
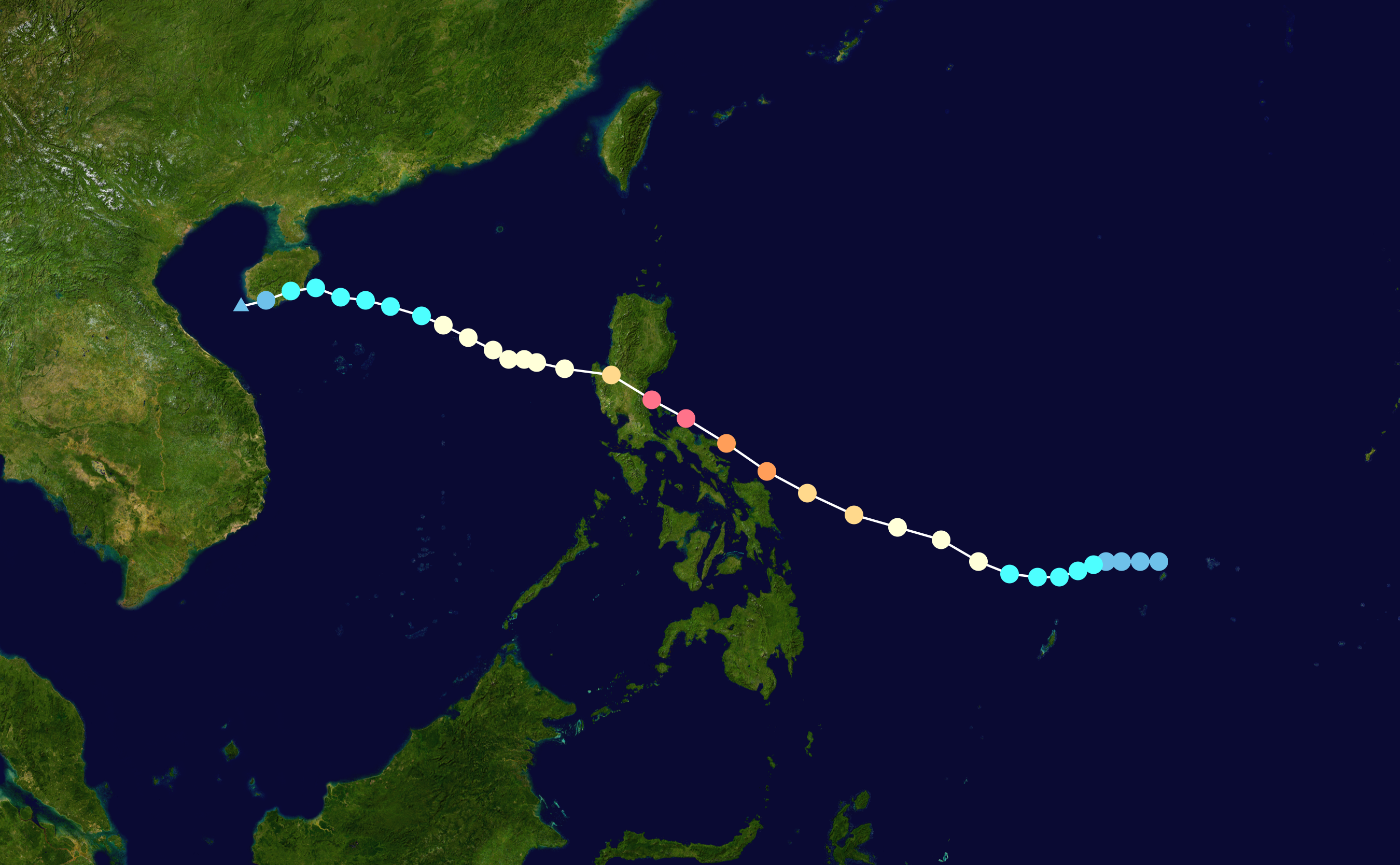
- Duration: October 20 – October 28
- Peak intensity: 140 km/h (85 mph) (10-min); 950 hPa (mbar)

Typhoon Ruby, which developed east of the Philippines on October 20, rapidly intensified to a 145 mph typhoon while approaching central Luzon. It hit on the 24th, and rapidly weakened to a minimal typhoon over the island. Ruby, with its disrupted circulation, remained weak over the South China Sea, and land interaction with Vietnam caused it to dissipate on the 28th. Ruby caused over 300 fatalities, with widespread flooding and damage over its track. Ruby brought heavy rains and a 12-foot storm surge to Guam and the Marianas Islands. On Luzon, the storm's 140 mph (230 km/h) winds caused tremendous damage to the town of Siniloan. In the Polillo Islands, east of Manila, Ruby spawned rare tornadoes that leveled homes. In the northern part of the Philippines, many fishing boats were wrecked by 30–40 foot waves, and 32 more people drowned. Damage in the Philippines totaled 5.64 billion Philippine Pesos (1989 pesos).

The passenger ferry the Doña Marilyn was in the Visayan Sea when the storm struck the vessel. The storm caused the ferry to list to the starboard until one of the decks was below the water, causing the ship to fill up rapidly. The passengers and crew tried to save the ship, but to no avail. The Doña Marilyn sank stern first taking 389 people with it. Only 147 people survived by clinging to life rafts.

=== Typhoon Skip (Yoning) ===
- Typhoon (JMA)
- Category 4 typhoon (SSHWS)
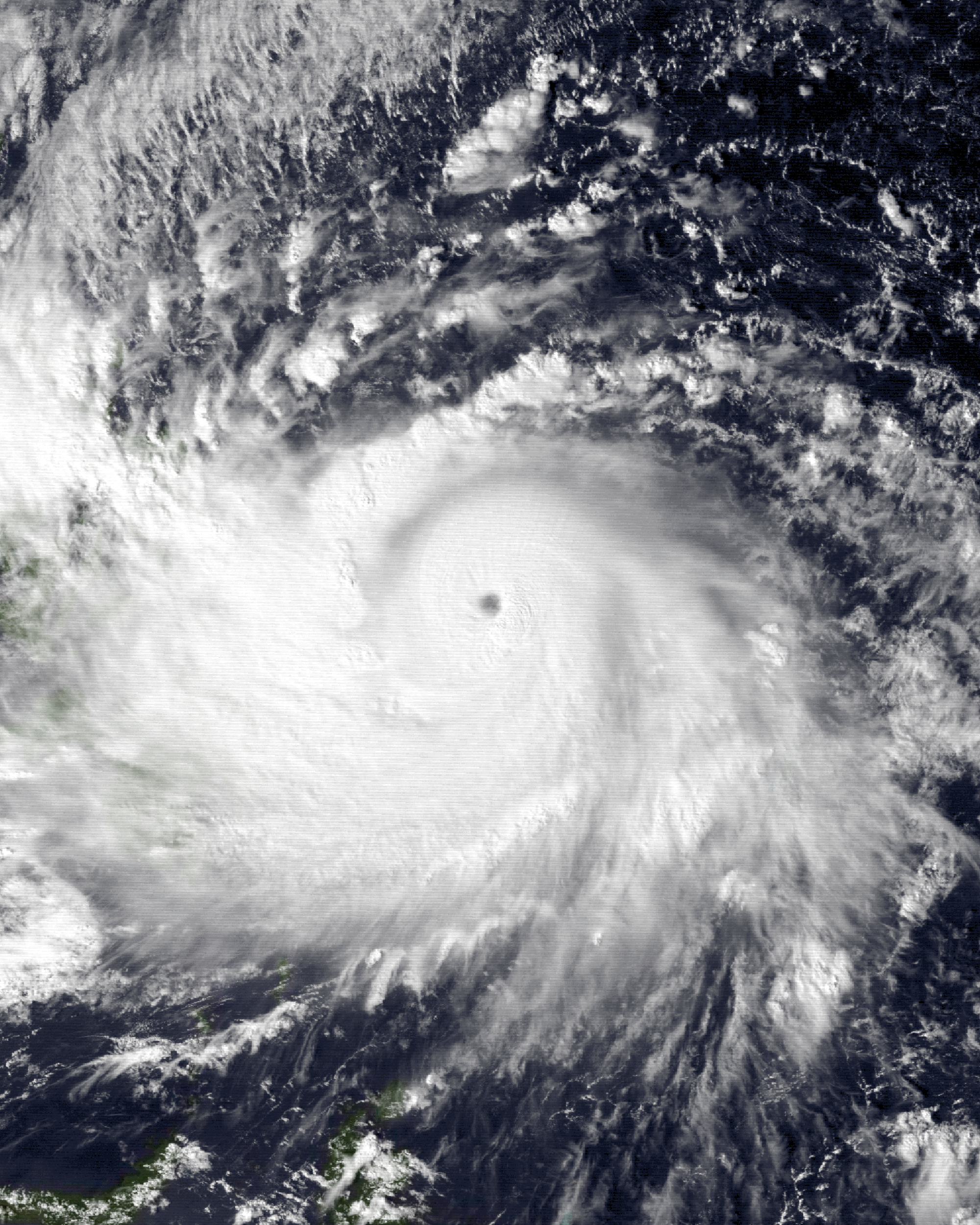
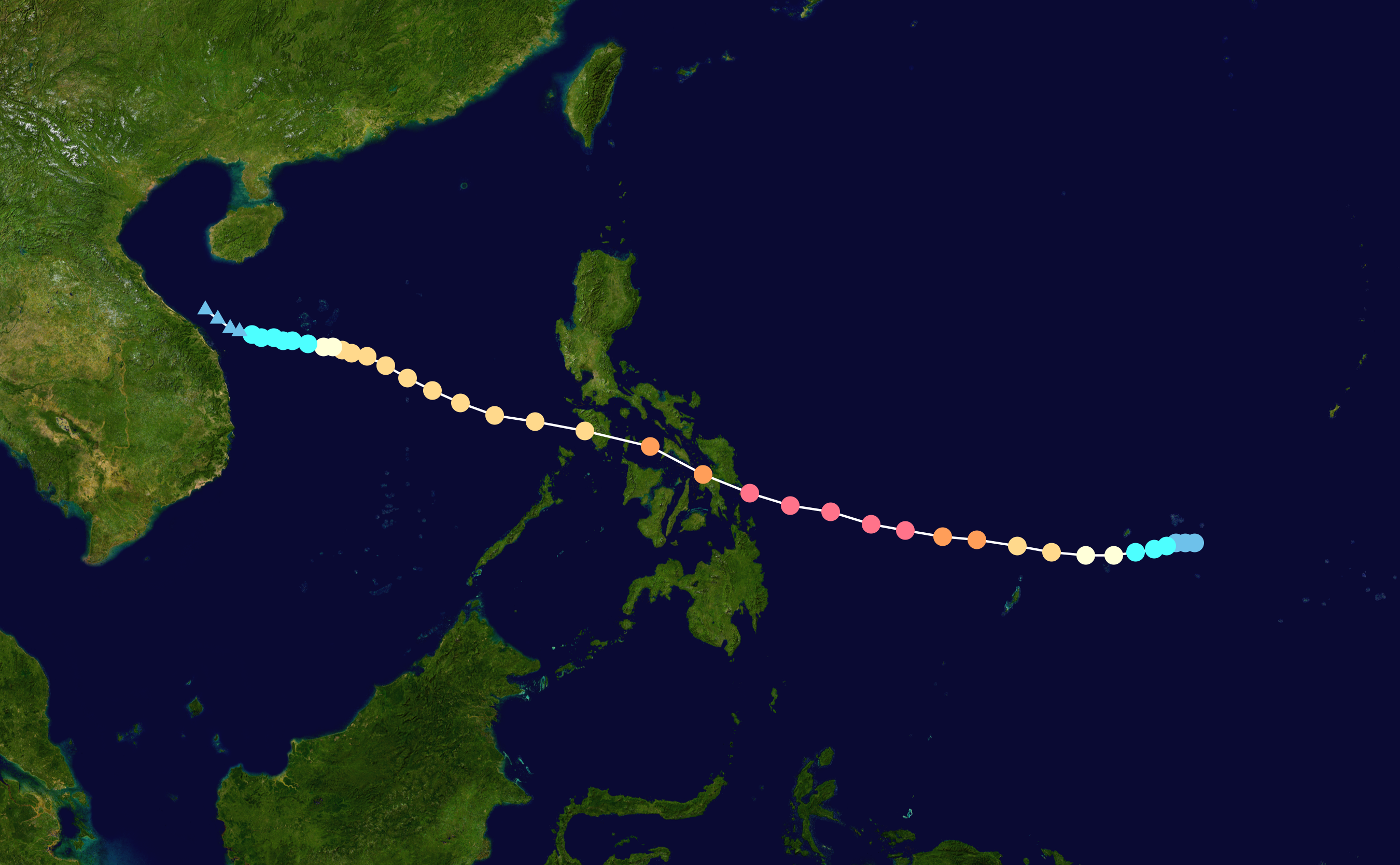
- Duration: November 3 – November 12
- Peak intensity: 150 km/h (90 mph) (10-min); 950 hPa (mbar)

Just 2 weeks after Ruby hit Luzon, Skip, which formed on November 3, hit the central Philippines as a 145 mph typhoon. Ruby reached the South China Sea on the 7th, and steadily weakened until dissipation on the 12th. Skip was responsible for killing 104 people (with 95 missing) and extensive damage to the coconut, rice, and sugar crops.

=== Severe Tropical Storm Tess (Welpring) ===
- Severe tropical storm (JMA)
- Category 1 typhoon (SSHWS)
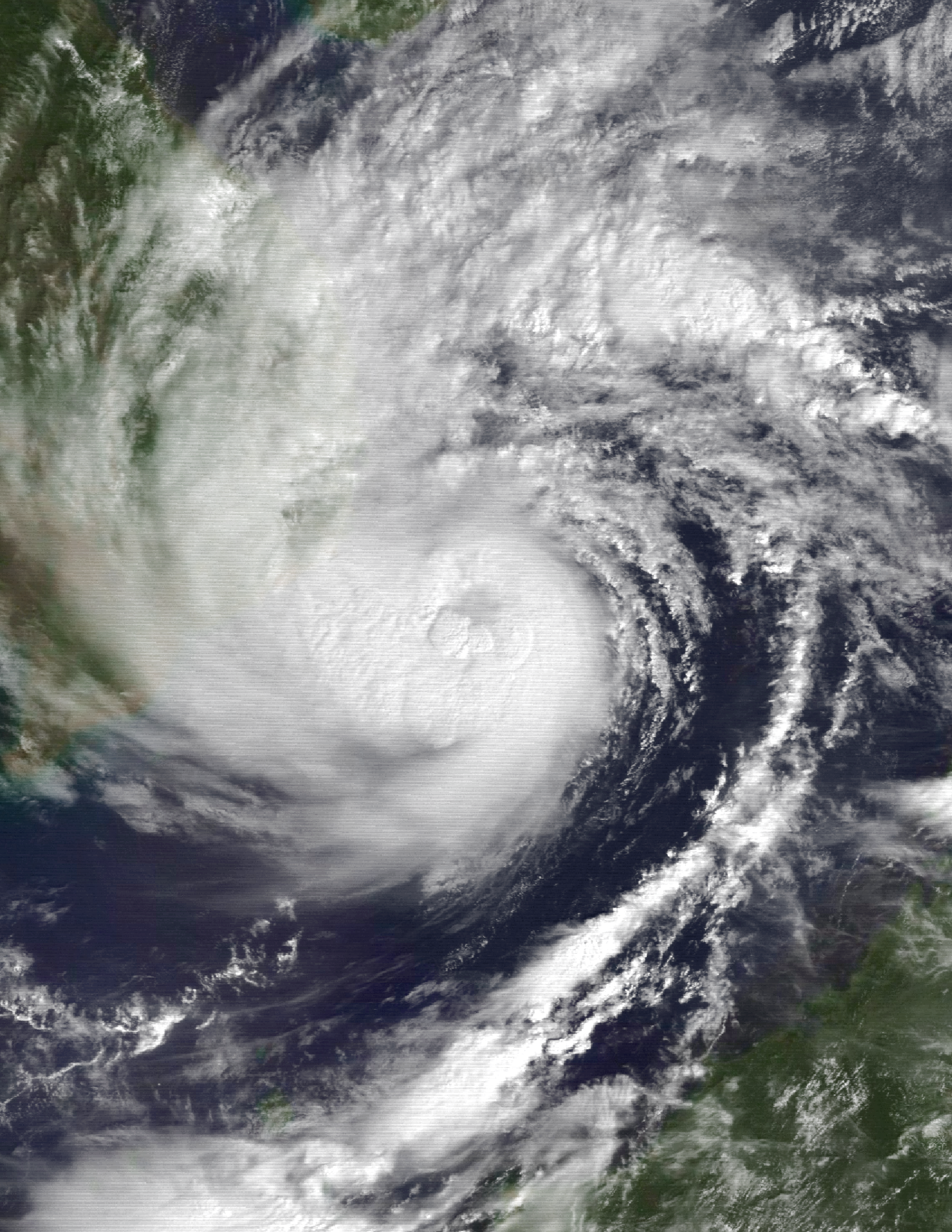
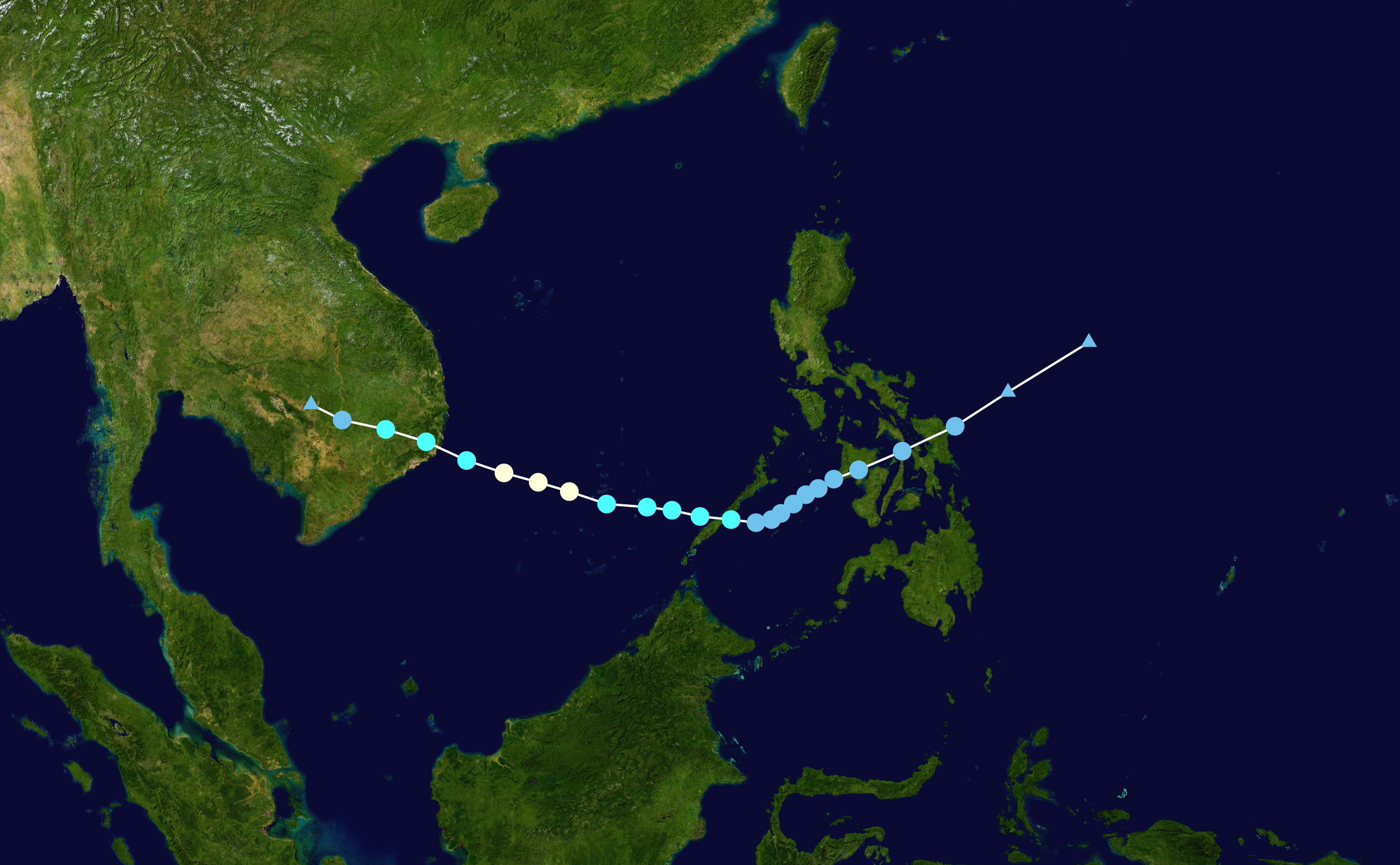
- Duration: November 1 – November 6
- Peak intensity: 110 km/h (70 mph) (10-min); 975 hPa (mbar)

After passing through the Philippines, a tropical disturbance organized in the South China Sea into a tropical depression late on the morning of November 4. Turning westward and strengthening, the cyclone became a tropical storm later that day, and then a typhoon by late November 5. It moved into Vietnam on November 6 and quickly weakened, becoming the only tropical cyclone that season to make landfall in the country. Its remains later moved across the Mekong River delta.

In Vietnam, Tropical Storm Tess has caused 55 deaths, left 83 people missing, and destroyed or washed away more than 13,000 houses.

=== Tropical Storm Val (Apiang) ===
- Tropical storm (JMA)
- Tropical storm (SSHWS)
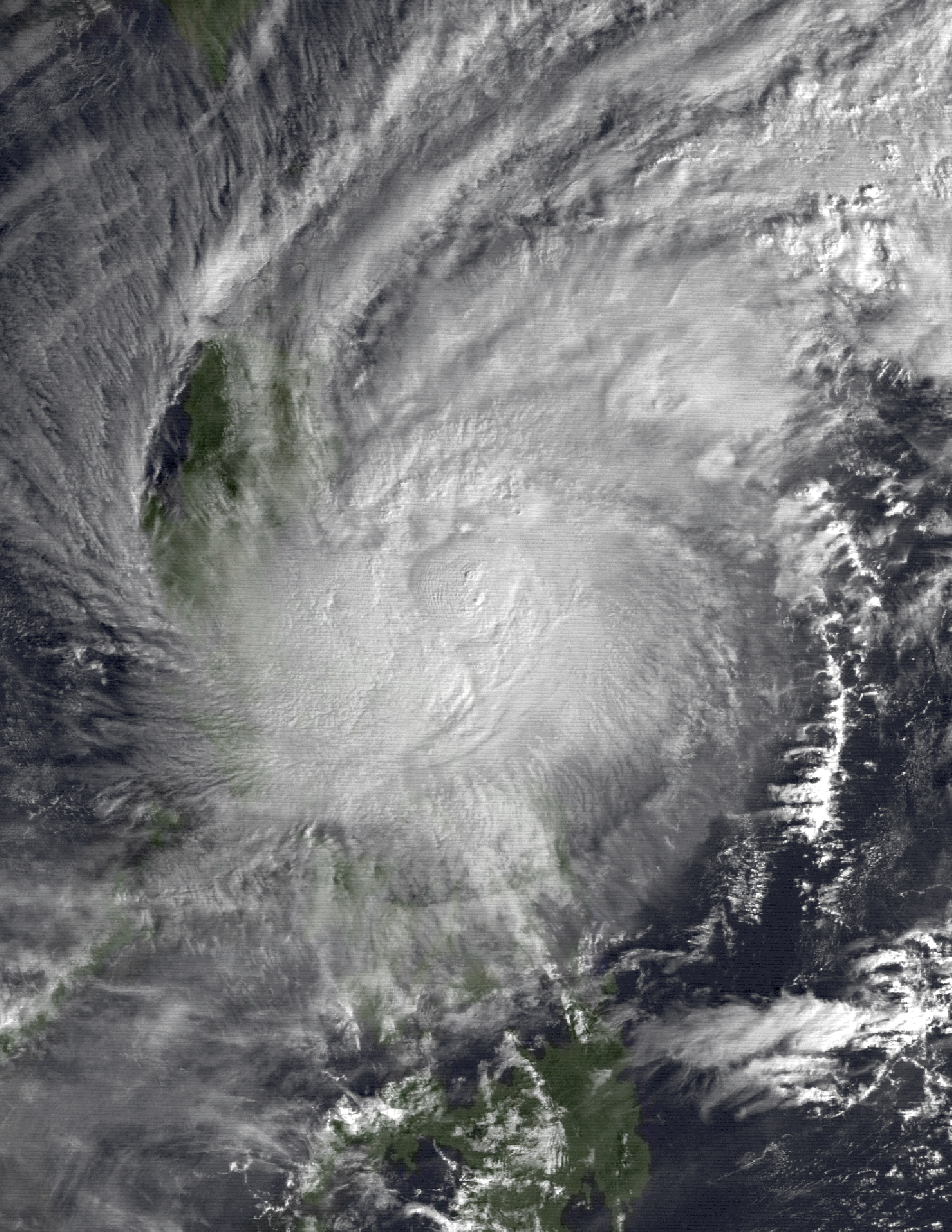
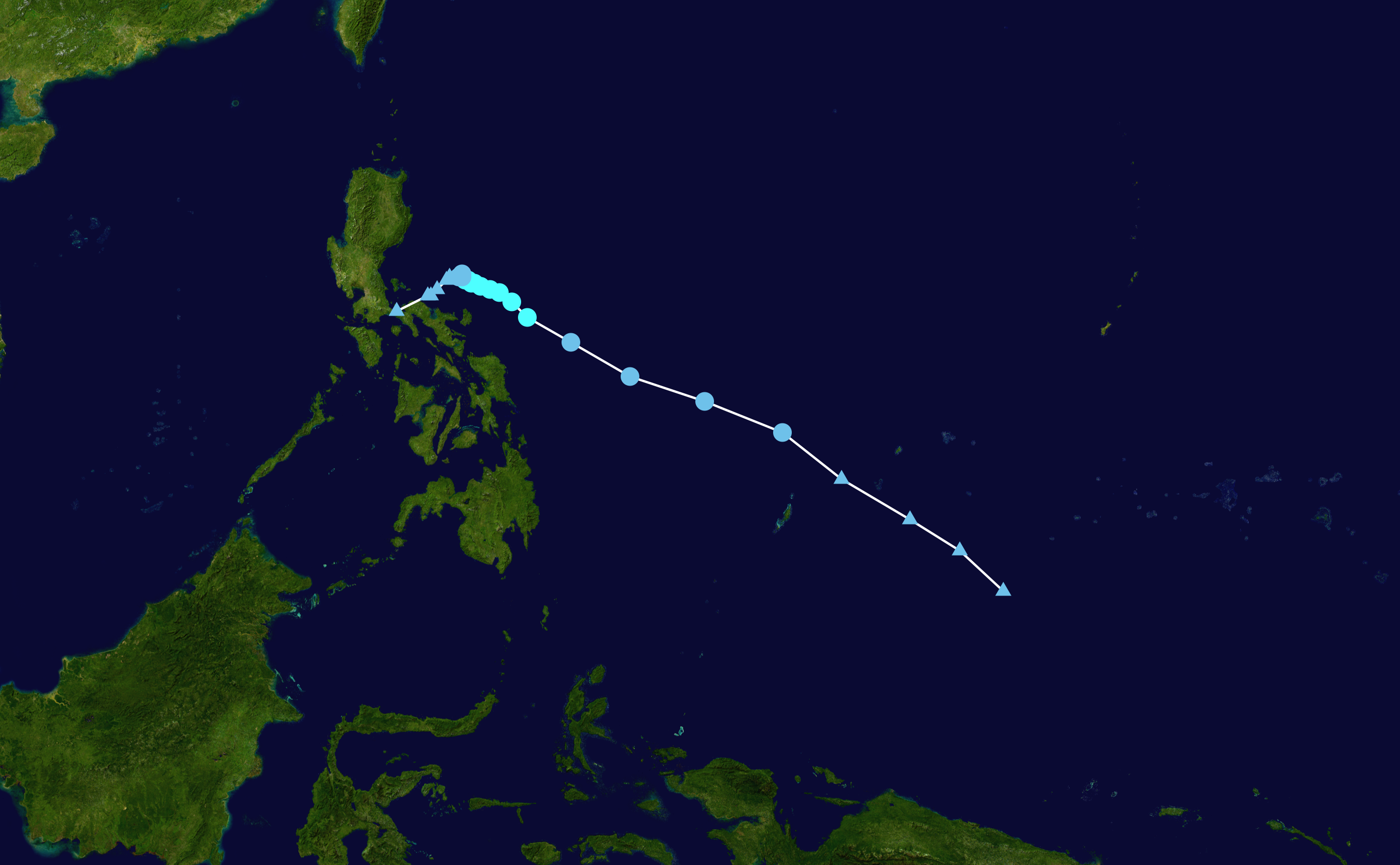
- Duration: December 21 – December 25
- Peak intensity: 85 km/h (50 mph) (10-min); 992 hPa (mbar)

The final tropical cyclone to develop in 1988 and the only in December, the origins of Tropical Storm Val. Tropical Storm Val was first spawned by an outbreak of Arctic air pushed southeastward across Asia on December 18. Within five days, this cold air mass extended from the southern Philippine Islands to the northern Marianas. The cold air quickly diminished, which spawned convection and multiple surface circulations across the monsoon trough. Thunderstorm activity consolidated on December 21, and an increase in organization prompted the issuance of a TCFA the next day. Later on December 22, both the JTWC and JMA upgraded the disturbance into a tropical depression. On December 24, the JMA upgraded the depression into Tropical Storm Val. Around the time, JTWC and JMA reported that Val attained its peak intensity of 105 and 80 km/h (65 and 50 mph). Also on December 24, Val, which was moving westward at around 40 km/h (25 mph), grounded to a halt. The storm's center became less defined, which resulted in a weakening trend. After tracing northward, Val was downgraded to a tropical depression on December 27. The JTWC ceased tracking Val on December 26, with the JMA doing the same the next day.

== Storm names ==
During the season 26 named tropical cyclones developed in the Western Pacific and were named by the Joint Typhoon Warning Center, when it was determined that they had become tropical storms. These names were contributed to a revised list which started in 1979.

Roy	Susan	Thad	Vanessa	Warren	Agnes	Bill	Clara	Doyle	Elsie	Fabian	Gay	Hal
Irma	Jeff	Kit	Lee	Mamie	Nelson	Odessa	Pat	Ruby	Skip	Tess	Val	

=== Philippines ===
Asiang	Biring	Konsing	Ditang	Edeng
Gloring	Huaning	Isang	Lusing	Maring
Ningning	Osang	Paring	Reming	Seniang
Toyang	Unsang	Welpring	Yoning	
Auxiliary list
				Apiang
Basiang (unused)	Kayang (unused)	Dorang (unused)	Enang (unused)	Grasing (unused)

The Philippine Atmospheric, Geophysical and Astronomical Services Administration uses its own naming scheme for tropical cyclones in their area of responsibility. PAGASA assigns names to tropical depressions that form within their area of responsibility and any tropical cyclone that might move into their area of responsibility. Should the list of names for a given year prove to be insufficient, names are taken from an auxiliary list, the first 6 of which are published each year before the season starts. Names not retired from this list will be used again in the 1992 season. This is the same list used for the 1984 season, with the exception of Ningning, Unsang and Apiang, which were used for the first (and only, in the case of Unsang) time this season after replacing Nitang, Undang and Aring. PAGASA uses its own naming scheme that starts in the Filipino alphabet, with names of Filipino female names ending with "ng" (A, B, K, D, etc.). Names that were not assigned/going to use are marked in gray.

=== Retirement ===
Because Typhoons Unsang and Yoning made extensive damage within the Philippines, the PAGASA later retired the names Unsang and Yoning and was replaced by Ulpiang and Yerling for the 1992 season.

== Season effects ==
This is a table of all of the storms that have formed in the 1987 Pacific typhoon season. It includes their duration, names, affected areas, damages, and death totals. Deaths in parentheses are additional and indirect (an example of an indirect death would be a traffic accident), but were still related to that storm. Damage and deaths include totals while the storm was extratropical, a wave, or a low, and all of the damage figures are in 1986 USD. Names listed in parentheses were assigned by PAGASA.

Name	Dates	Peak intensity			Areas affected	Damage (USD)	Deaths	Ref(s).
Name	Dates	Category	Wind speed	Pressure	Areas affected	Damage (USD)	Deaths	Ref(s).
Roy (Asiang)	January 7–19	Very strong typhoon	155 km/h (96 mph)	940 hPa (27.76 inHg)	Marshall Islands, Mariana Islands, Caroline Islands, Philippines	$28.5 million	2	
Susan (Biring)	May 28 – June 3	Typhoon	120 km/h (75 mph)	975 hPa (28.79 inHg)	Philippines, Taiwan, Ryukyu Islands	$5.5 million	46	
03W (Konsing)	June 3–6	Tropical storm	65 km/h (40 mph)	1,000 hPa (29.53 inHg)	Philippines, Taiwan	None	None	
Thad (Ditang)	June 17–25	Typhoon	130 km/h (81 mph)	970 hPa (28.64 inHg)	Philippines	None	None	
TD	June 22–26	Tropical depression	Not specified	1,004 hPa (29.65 inHg)	None	None	None	
Vanessa (Edeng)	June 26–29	Severe tropical storm	100 km/h (62 mph)	990 hPa (29.23 inHg)	Philippines, South China	None	None	
Gloring	July 6–9	Tropical depression	45 km/h (28 mph)	1,000 hPa (29.53 inHg)	Taiwan	None	None	
Warren (Huaning)	July 12–20	Very strong typhoon	165 km/h (103 mph)	940 hPa (27.76 inHg)	Mariana Islands, Caroline Islands, Philippines, Taiwan, China	$281 million	23	
TD	July 25–28	Tropical depression	Not specified	998 hPa (29.47 inHg)	None	None	None	
Agnes	July 27 – August 1	Severe tropical storm	95 km/h (59 mph)	975 hPa (28.79 inHg)	None	None	None	
TD	July 29–30	Tropical depression	Not specified	1,002 hPa (29.59 inHg)	None	None	None	
Eight	August 1–3	Tropical storm	65 km/h (40 mph)	998 hPa (29.47 inHg)	Japan	None	None	
Isang	August 1–3	Tropical depression	Not specified	1,002 hPa (29.59 inHg)	South China	None	None	
TD	August 4–6	Tropical depression	Not specified	1,004 hPa (29.65 inHg)	Ryukyu Islands	None	None	
Bill (Isang)	August 4–9	Tropical storm	85 km/h (53 mph)	985 hPa (29.09 inHg)	Ryukyu Islands, East China	$268 million	110	
Clara	August 5–16	Tropical storm	75 km/h (47 mph)	994 hPa (29.35 inHg)	None	None	None	
TD	August 6–16	Tropical depression	Not specified	1,000 hPa (29.53 inHg)	Japan	None	None	
TD	August 9	Tropical depression	Not specified	1,000 hPa (29.53 inHg)	None	None	None	
TD	August 10–13	Tropical depression	Not specified	1,002 hPa (29.59 inHg)	South China	None	None	
TD	August 12–13	Tropical depression	Not specified	1,002 hPa (29.59 inHg)	Japan	None	None	
TD	August 12–14	Tropical depression	Not specified	1,002 hPa (29.59 inHg)	Japan	None	None	
Eleven	August 13–18	Tropical storm	65 km/h (40 mph)	1,000 hPa (29.53 inHg)	Japan, Soviet Union	None	None	
Doyle	August 13–24	Very strong typhoon	165 km/h (103 mph)	930 hPa (27.46 inHg)	None	None	None	
TD	August 13	Tropical depression	Not specified	1,004 hPa (29.65 inHg)	Japan	None	None	
Thirteen	August 13–16	Tropical storm	65 km/h (40 mph)	1,000 hPa (29.53 inHg)	Japan	None	None	
TD	August 15–16	Tropical depression	Not specified	1,010 hPa (29.83 inHg)	None	None	None	
TD	August 18	Tropical depression	Not specified	1,006 hPa (29.71 inHg)	None	None	None	
Fabian	August 24 – September 3	Severe tropical storm	110 km/h (68 mph)	970 hPa (28.64 inHg)	Japan	None	None	
Elsie	August 26 – September 1	Tropical storm	85 km/h (53 mph)	992 hPa (29.29 inHg)	None	None	None	
Gay	September 2–4	Tropical storm	75 km/h (47 mph)	996 hPa (29.41 inHg)	None	None	None	
TD	September 3–6	Tropical depression	Not specified	1,010 hPa (29.83 inHg)	None	None	None	
Uleki	September 8–16	Typhoon	130 km/h (81 mph)	945 hPa (27.91 inHg)	Wake Island	None	None	
Hal	September 8–17	Typhoon	155 km/h (96 mph)	945 hPa (27.91 inHg)	Japan	None	None	
TD	September 9–10	Tropical depression	Not specified	1,008 hPa (29.77 inHg)	Japan	None	None	
Irma	September 11–17	Severe tropical storm	100 km/h (62 mph)	990 hPa (29.23 inHg)	None	None	None	
Jeff (Lusing)	September 11–17	Tropical storm	85 km/h (53 mph)	994 hPa (29.35 inHg)	None	None	None	
Kit (Maring)	September 19–22	Severe tropical storm	100 km/h (62 mph)	980 hPa (28.94 inHg)	Philippines, South China	$35.4 million	8	
Lee (Ningning)	September 19–25	Severe tropical storm	95 km/h (59 mph)	990 hPa (29.23 inHg)	Mariana Islands, Ryukyu Islands	None	None	
Mamie	September 19–24	Tropical storm	85 km/h (53 mph)	990 hPa (29.23 inHg)	South China, Vietnam	Unknown	9	
TD	September 23–24	Tropical depression	Not specified	1,002 hPa (29.59 inHg)	None	None	None	
TD	September 28 – October 3	Tropical depression	45 km/h (28 mph)	1,000 hPa (29.53 inHg)	Philippines, Vietnam, South China	None	None	
Nelson (Paring)	September 30 – October 9	Very strong typhoon	185 km/h (115 mph)	915 hPa (27.02 inHg)	Philippines, Japan	None	None	
Osang	October 1–2	Tropical depression	Not specified	1,004 hPa (29.65 inHg)	Philippines	None	None	
TD	October 6–7	Tropical depression	Not specified	1,002 hPa (29.59 inHg)	None	None	None	
Twenty-five	October 7–10	Tropical storm	85 km/h (53 mph)	992 hPa (29.29 inHg)	Vietnam	Unknown	103 (combined with TD)	
Reming	October 8	Tropical storm	65 km/h (40 mph)	1,006 hPa (29.71 inHg)	Philippines	None	None	
Odessa (Seniang)	October 8–19	Typhoon	130 km/h (81 mph)	965 hPa (28.50 inHg)	Mariana Islands	None	None	
TD	October 15–17	Tropical depression	Not specified	1,004 hPa (29.65 inHg)	Vietnam, Cambodia, Thailand	None	None	
Pat (Toyang)	October 17–23	Severe tropical storm	110 km/h (68 mph)	980 hPa (28.94 inHg)	Philippines, China, Vietnam	$16 million	2	
Ruby (Unsang)	October 20–29	Typhoon	140 km/h (87 mph)	950 hPa (28.05 inHg)	Philippines, South China	$311 million	288	
Tess (Welpring)	November 1–7	Severe tropical storm	110 km/h (68 mph)	975 hPa (28.79 inHg)	Philippines, Vietnam	$22.4 million	123	
Skip (Yoning)	November 3–12	Typhoon	140 km/h (87 mph)	950 hPa (28.05 inHg)	Philippines, Vietnam	$132 million	237	
TD	December 11–12	Tropical depression	Not specified	1,004 hPa (29.65 inHg)	None	None	None	
Val (Apiang)	December 22–27	Tropical storm	85 km/h (53 mph)	992 hPa (29.29 inHg)	Philippines	None	None	
Season aggregates
52 systems	January 7 – December 27, 1988		185 km/h (115 mph)	915 hPa (27.02 inHg)		>$504 million	>801	

== See also ==
- 1988 Pacific hurricane season
- 1988 Atlantic hurricane season
- 1988 North Indian Ocean cyclone season
- South-West Indian Ocean cyclone seasons: 1987–88, 1988–89
- Australian region cyclone seasons: 1987–88, 1988–89
- South Pacific cyclone seasons: 1987–88, 1988–89
