= List of Filipino beauty pageant winners =

This is a list of notable Filipino beauty pageant winners who have represented the Philippines in various beauty pageants.

== A ==
- Anjanette Abayari
- Yllana Aduana
- Tetchie Agbayani
- Carlene Aguilar
- Sharifa Akeel
- Irha Mel Alfeche
- Naelah Alshorbaji
- Alethea Ambrosio
- Pauline Amelinckx
- Ariella Arida
- Hannah Arnold

== B ==
- Roxie Baeyens
- Maricar Balagtas
- Raine Baljak
- Kevin Balot
- Joy Barcoma
- Gabrielle Basiano
- Kirby Ann Basken
- Leren Bautista
- Samantha Bernardo
- Nicole Borromeo
- Alexie Brooks
- Herlene Budol
- Jasmin Bungay

== C ==
- Emmanuelle Camcam
- Gabbi Carballo
- Maria Teresa Carlson†
- Nikki Buenafe Cheveh
- Ann Colis
- Nicole Cordoves
- Celeste Cortesi
- Gemma Cruz

== D ==
- Arlene Cris Damot
- Mutya Datul
- Isabelle de Leon
- Trinidad de Leon†
- Anne De Mesa
- Nikki de Moura
- Michelle Dee
- Marizza Delgado
- Angelee delos Reyes
- Rina Andrea delos Santos
- Gloria Diaz
- Rio Diaz†
- Katrina Dimaranan
- Liza Diño
- Alice Dixson

== E ==
- Myrna Esguerra
- Marilen Espino

== F ==
- Chelsea Fernandez
- Patricia Fernandez
- Trinidad Fernandez
- Gwendolyne Fourniol

== G ==
- Karen Gallman
- Gazini Ganados
- Melody Gersbach†
- Anita Gomez
- Beatrice Gomez
- Maita Gomez†
- Charlene Gonzales
- Krishnah Gravidez
- Catriona Gray
- Michele Gumabao
- Ruffa Gutierrez

== H ==
- Mela Habijan
- Jeanne Harn
- Karla Henry
- Jamie Herrell

== I ==
- Karen Ibasco
- Athena Imperial

== J ==
- Kris Tiffany Janson
- Katrina Johnson

== K ==
- Maria Kalaw
- Yedda Kittilsvedt
- Krista Kleiner
- Ganiel Krishnan

== L ==
- Sasha Lacuna
- Anna Lakrini
- Mary Jean Lastimosa
- Laura Lehmann
- Katrina Llegado
- Angelica Lopez
- Maria Isabel Lopez
- Janicel Lubina

== M ==
- Nicole Magadia
- Bea Magtanong
- Ahtisa Manalo
- Bianca Manalo
- Chelsea Manalo
- Trixie Maristela
- Melanie Marquez
- Paz Márquez
- Winwyn Marquez
- AZ Martinez
- Dia Maté
- Rabiya Mateo
- Annabelle McDonnell
- Christi McGarry
- Beatriz Mclelland
- Koreen Medina
- Maxine Medina
- Bea Millan-Windorski
- Cindy Miranda
- Feliza Teresa Miro
- Maureen Montagne
- Maricel Morales
- Margie Moran

== N ==
- Dianne Necio

== O ==
- Cindy Obeñita
- Angelia Ong
- CJ Opiaza

== P ==
- Sara Jane Paez
- Dindi Pajares
- Samantha Panlilio
- Hillarie Parungao
- Evangeline Pascual
- Cyrille Payumo
- April Ross Perez
- Tracy Perez
- Rachel Peters
- Aurora Pijuan
- Pilar Pilapil
- Carmen Planas

== Q ==
- Miriam Quiambao
- Lara Quigaman
- Jonavi Raisa Quiray

== R ==
- Venus Raj
- Lia Ramos
- Jenny Ramp
- Fuschia Anne Ravena
- Queenierich Rehman
- Daisy Reyes
- Katarina Rodriguez
- Gwendoline Ruais
- Vickie Rushton

== S ==
- Janina San Miguel
- Bea Santiago
- Joanne Santos
- Riza Santos
- Nicole Schmitz
- Lorraine Schuck
- Imelda Schweighart
- Sandra Seifert
- Sophia Senoron
- Aurora Sevilla
- Parul Shah
- Tisha Silang
- Rosario Silayan†
- Asia Rose Simpson
- Apriel Smith
- Gwendoline Soriano
- Stephany Stefanowitz
- Shamcey Supsup
- Tamera Szijarto

== T ==
- Roberta Tamondong
- Francesca Taruc
- Janelle Tee
- Thia Thomalla
- Emma Tiglao
- Keylyn Trajano
- Janine Tugonon
- Patricia Tumulak

== U ==
- Cathy Untalan

== V ==
- Wendy Valdez
- Tarah Valencia
- Kylie Verzosa
- Pura Villanueva

== W ==
- Valerie Weigmann
- Maggie Wilson
- Pia Wurtzbach

== Y ==
- Megan Young
- Bella Ysmael

== Gallery ==
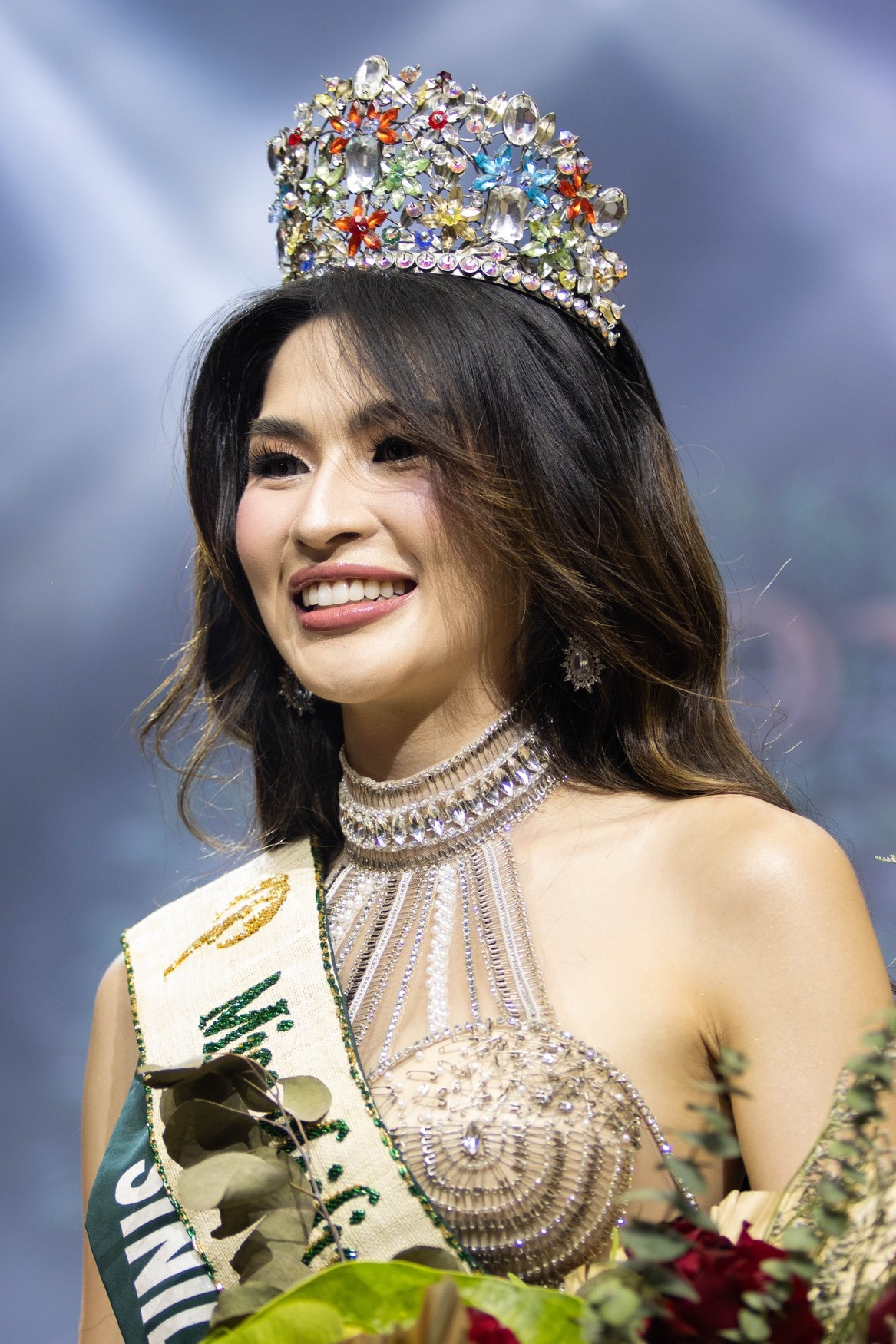
Yllana Aduana
Miss Earth ― Air 2023

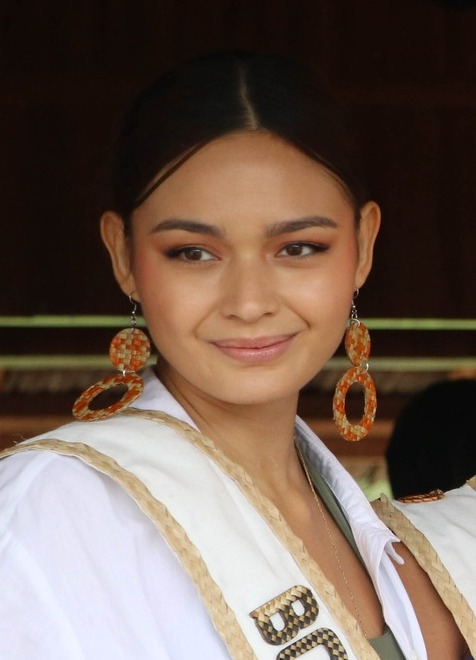
Pauline Amelinckx
Miss Supranational 2023 1st Runner-up

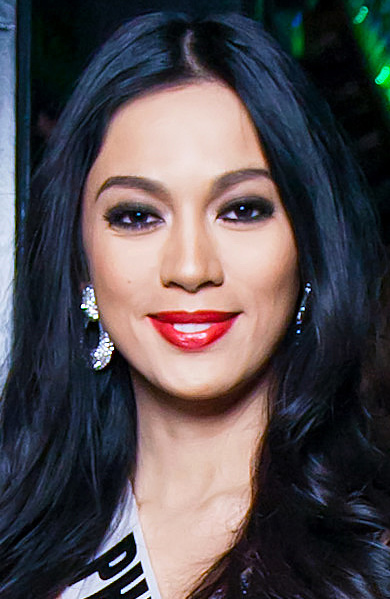
Ariella Arida
Miss Universe 2013 3rd Runner-up

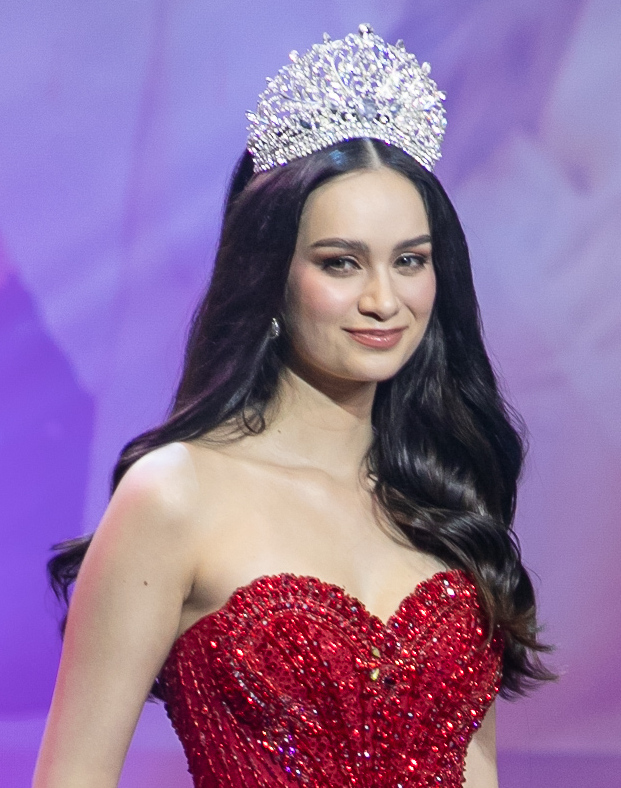
Hannah Arnold
Binibining Pilipinas ― International 2021

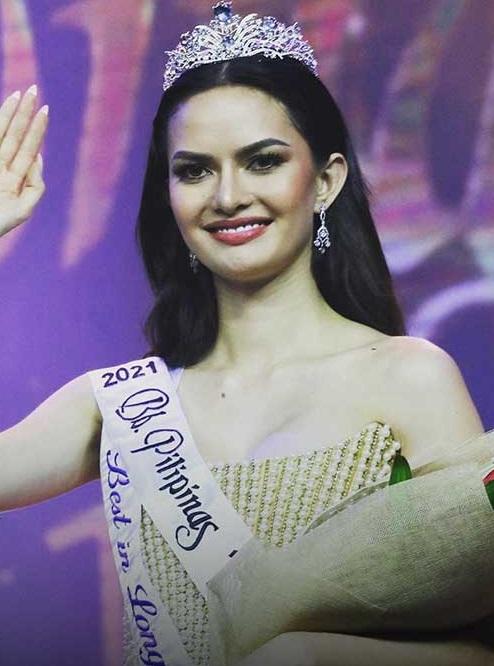
Gabrielle Basiano
Binibining Pilipinas ― Intercontinental 2022

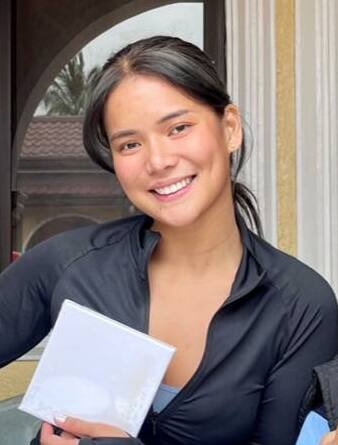
Leren Bautista
Miss Tourism Queen of the Year International 2015

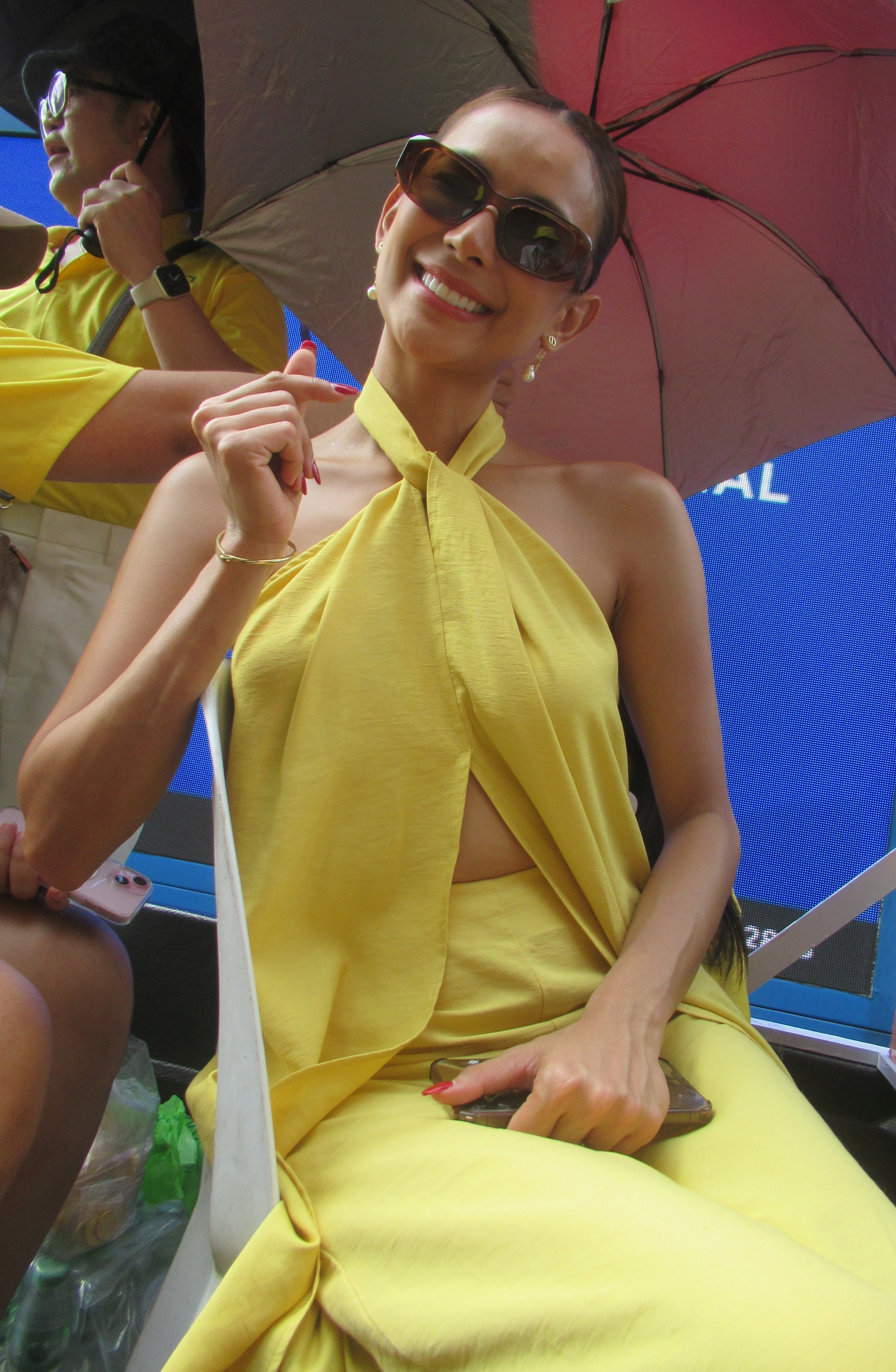
Samantha Bernardo
Miss Grand International 2020 1st Runner-up

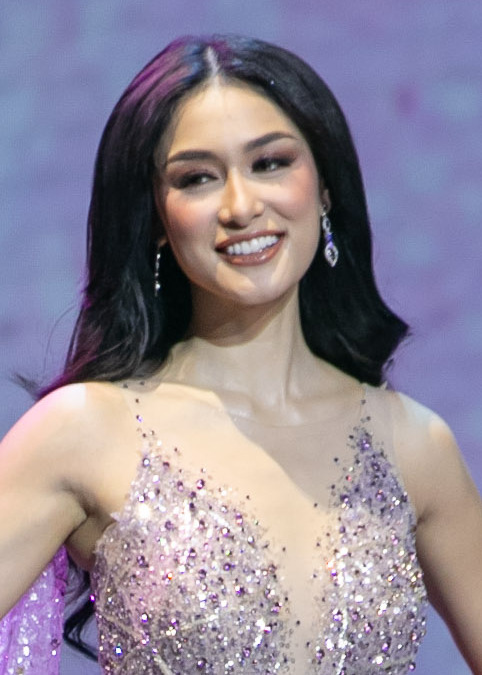
Nicole Borromeo
Miss International 2023 3rd Runner-up

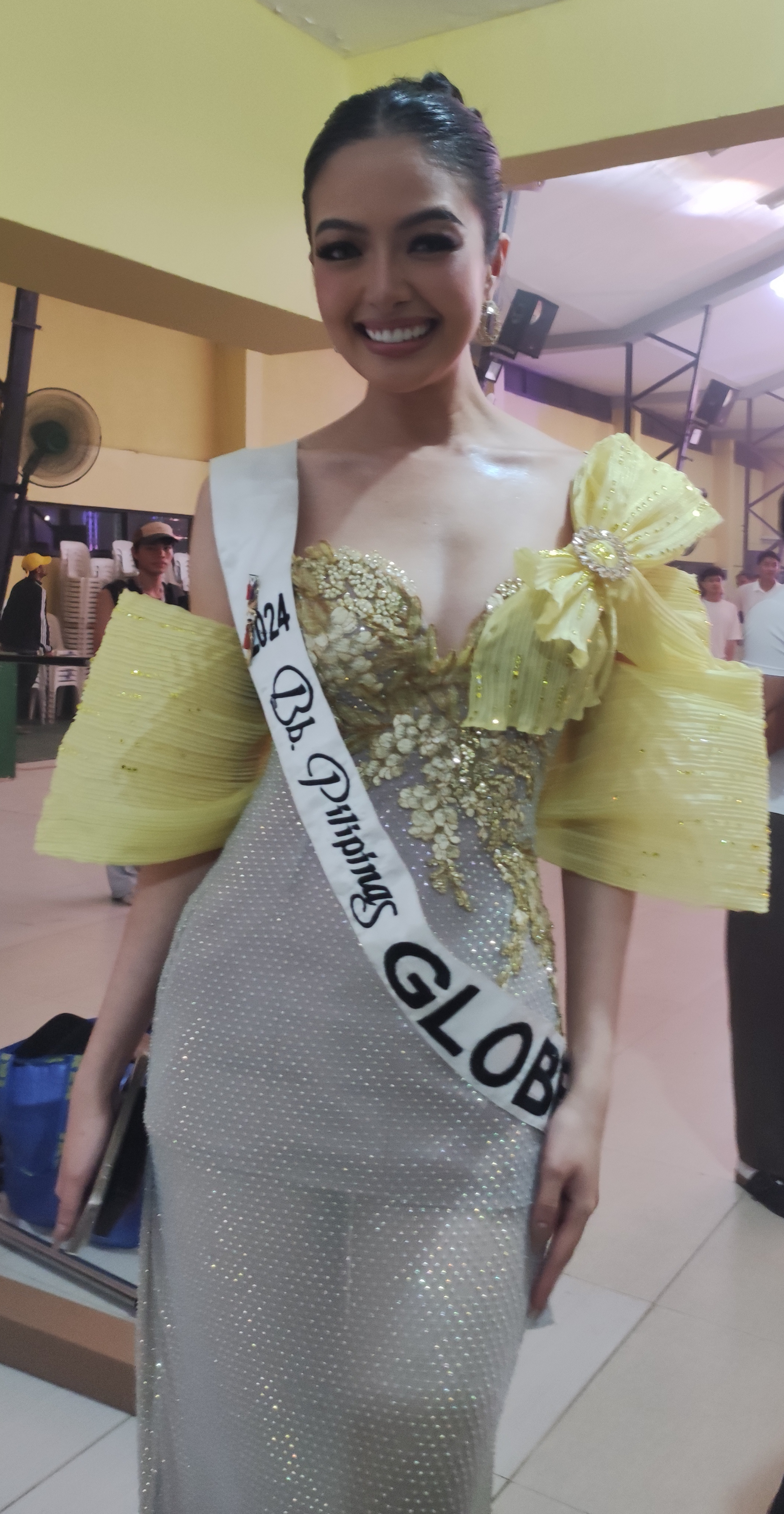
Jasmin Bungay
The Miss Globe 2024 2nd Runner-up

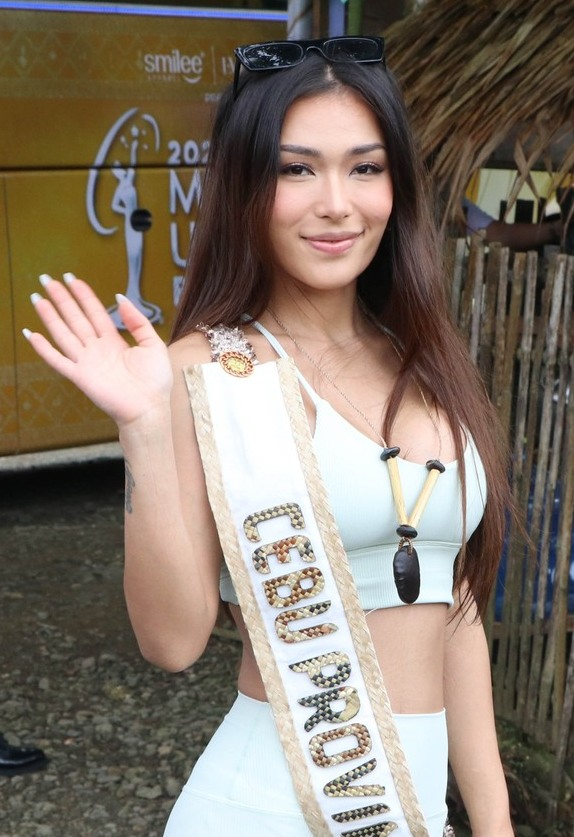
Emmanuelle Camcam
Reina Hispanoamericana 2021 3rd Runner-up

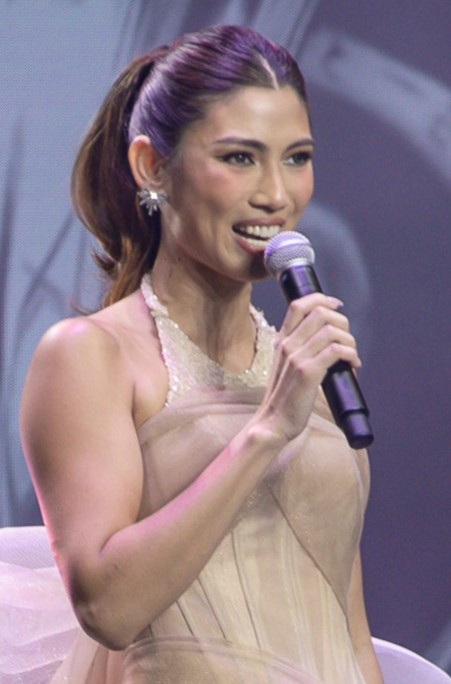
Nicole Cordoves
Miss Grand International 2016 1st Runner-up

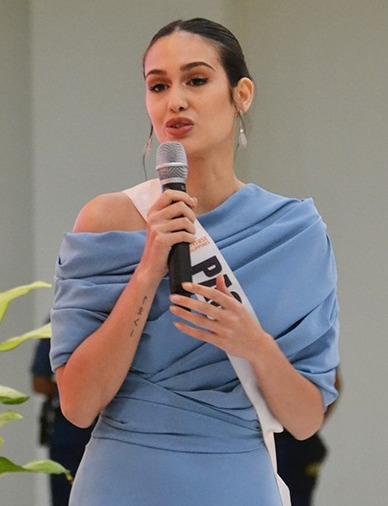
Celeste Cortesi
Miss Universe Philippines 2022

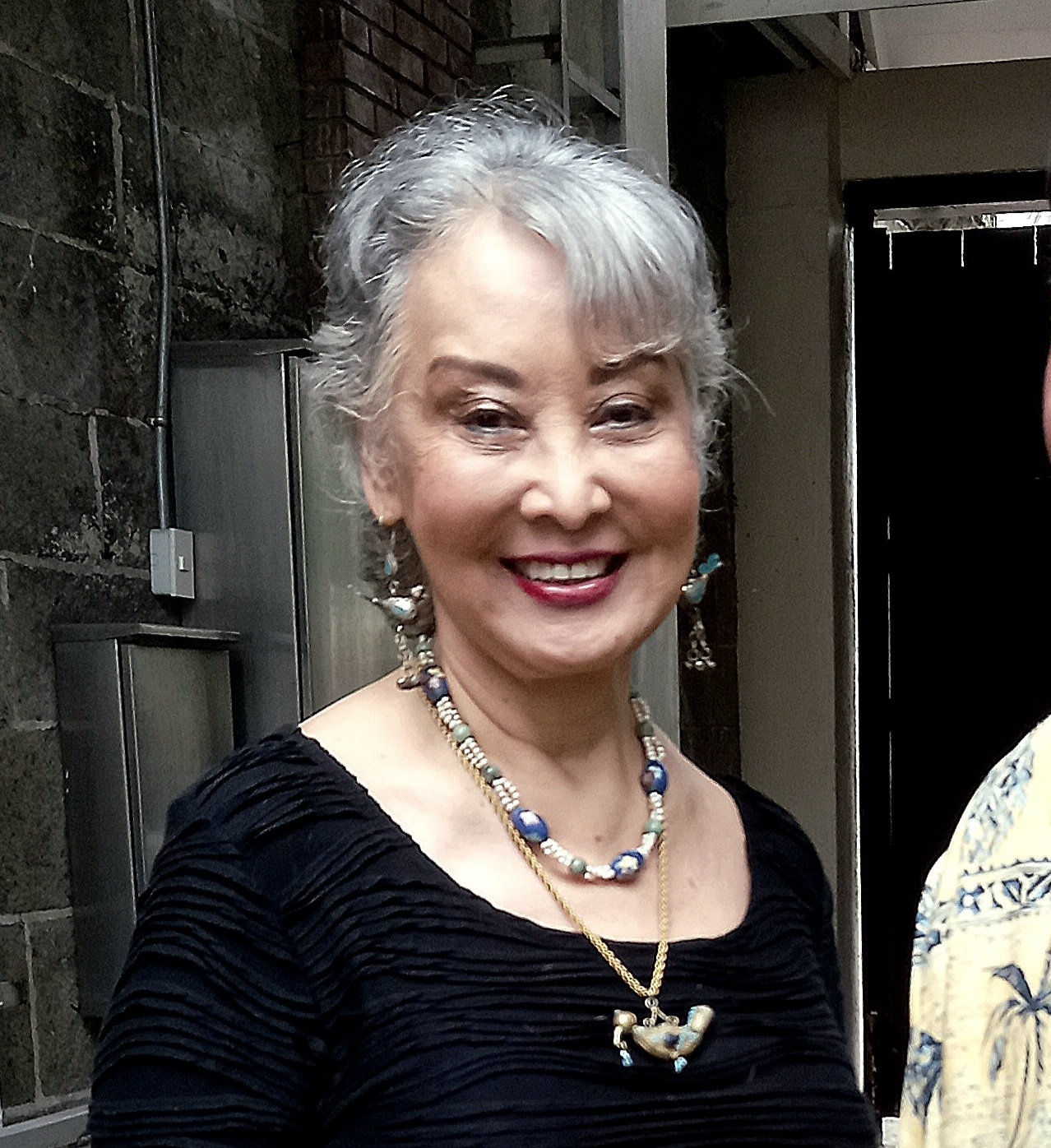
Gemma Cruz
Miss International 1964

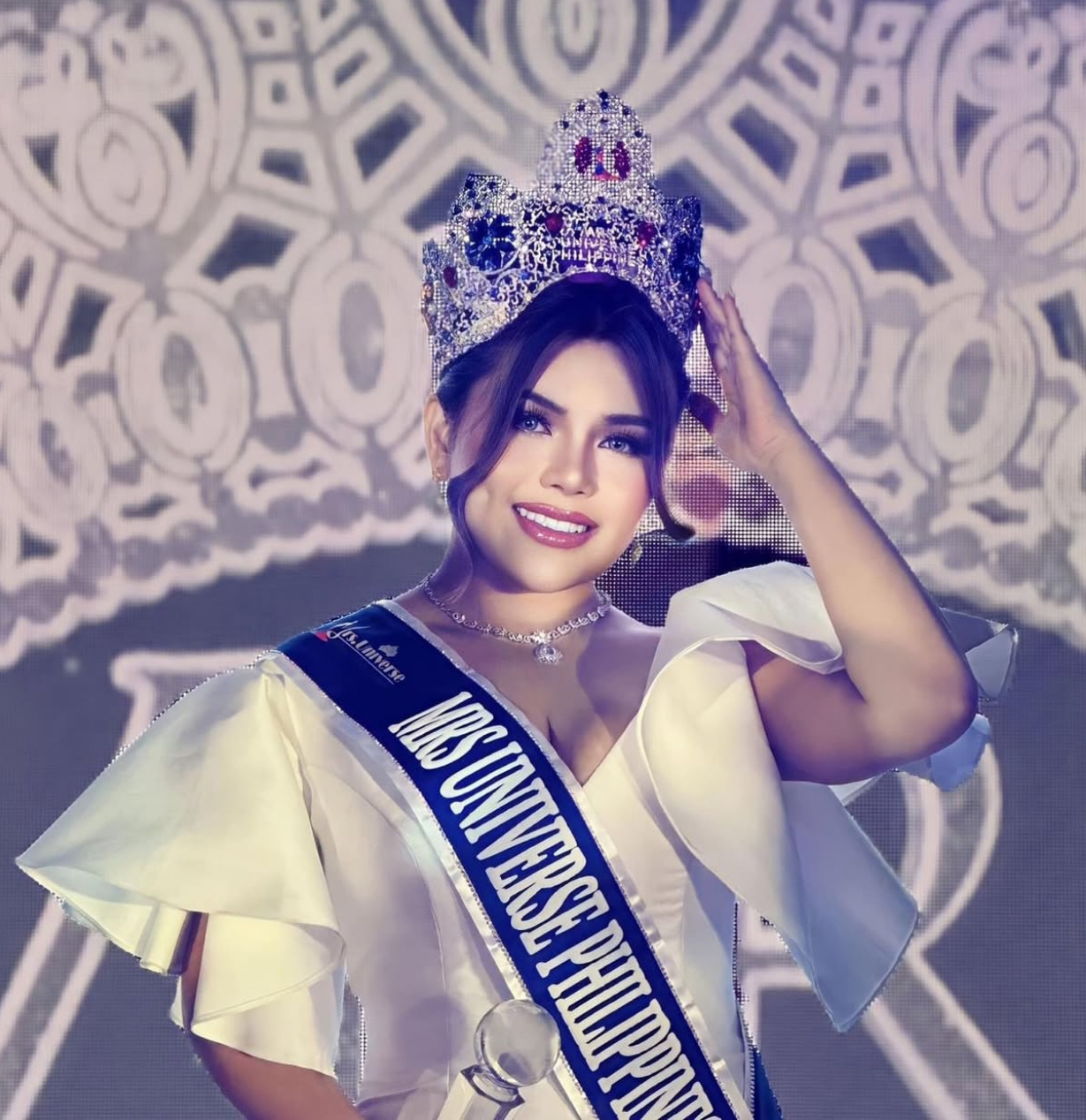
Arlene Cris Damot
Mrs. Universe 2023 2nd Runner-up

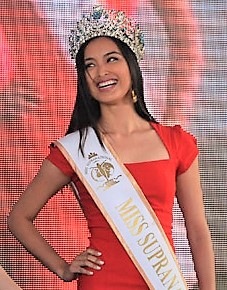
Mutya Datul
Miss Supranational 2013

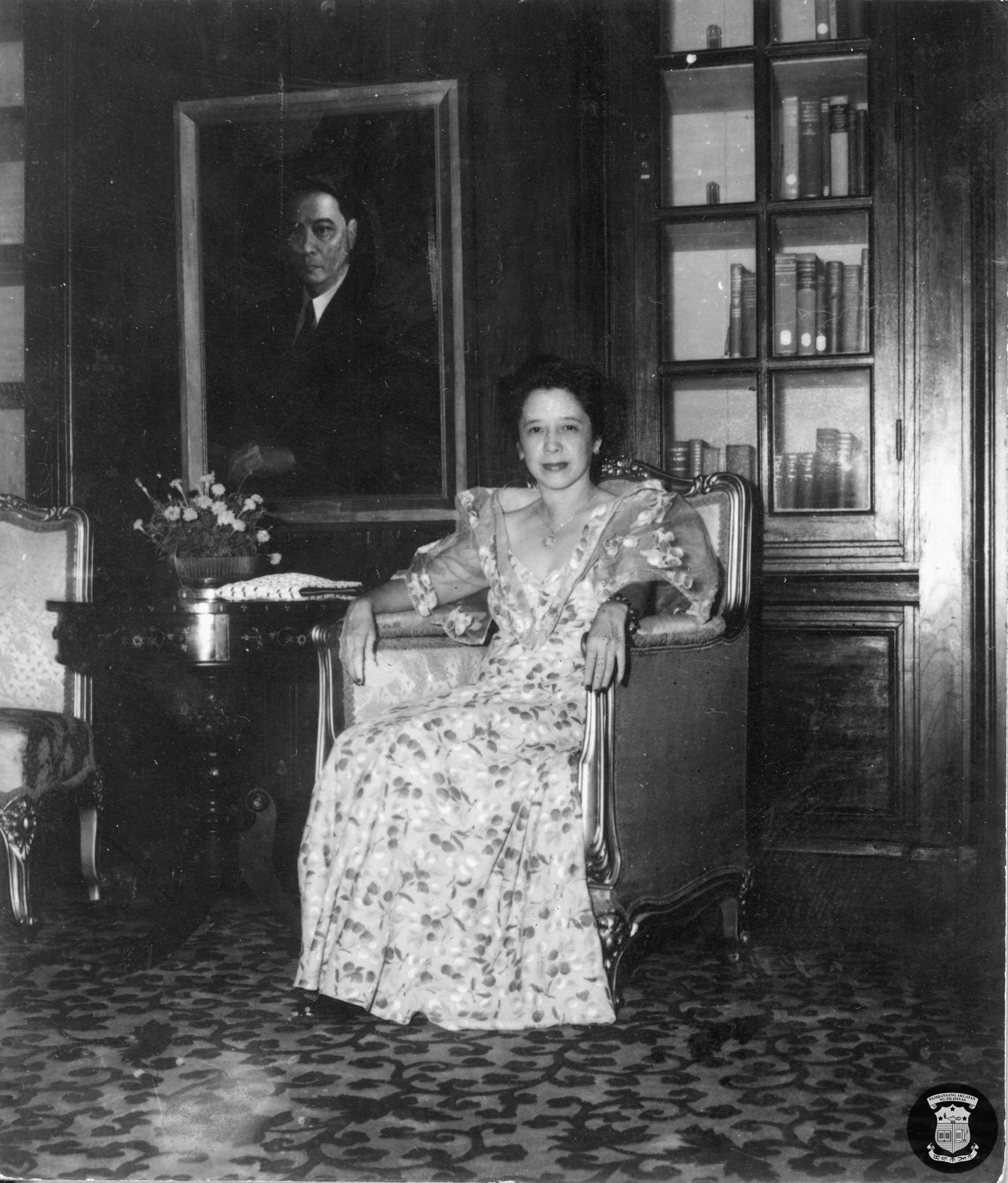
Trinidad de Leon
Manila Carnival Queen ― Queen of the Orient 1920

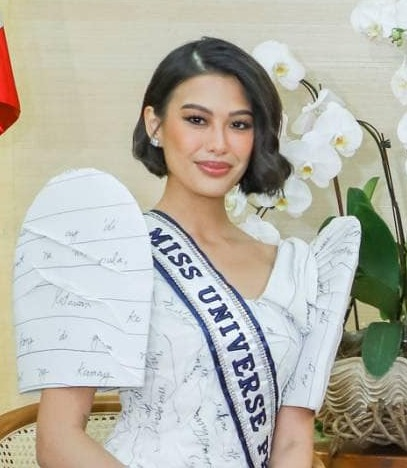
Michelle Dee
Miss Universe Philippines 2023

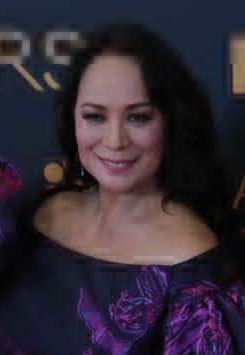
Gloria Diaz
Miss Universe 1969

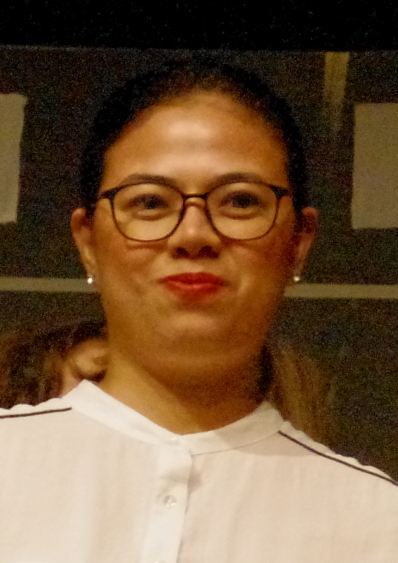
Liza Diño
Mutya ng Pilipinas ― Tourism International 2001

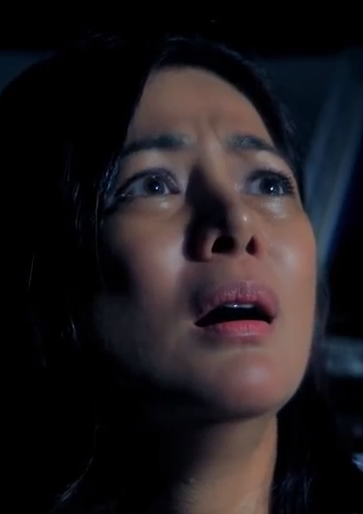
Alice Dixson
Binibining Pilipinas ― International 1986

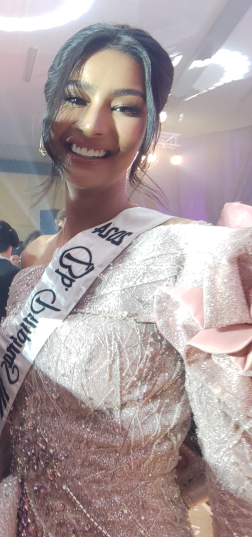
Myrna Esguerra
Binibining Pilipinas ― International 2024

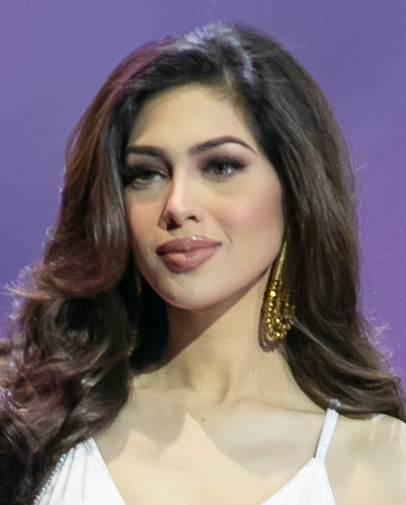
Chelsea Fernandez
Miss Cosmo Philippines 2025

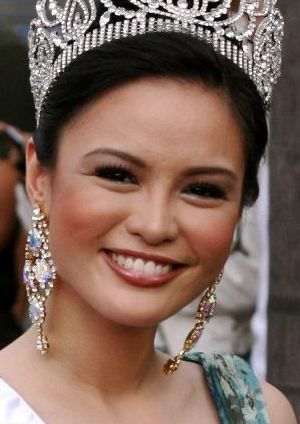
Patricia Fernandez
Binibining Pilipinas ― International 2008

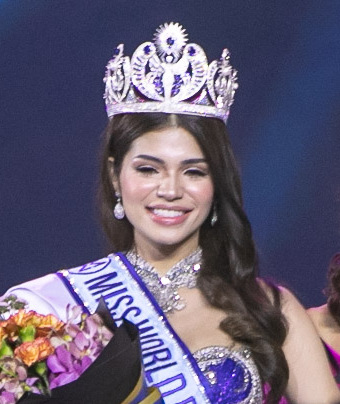
Gwendolyne Fourniol
Miss World Philippines 2022

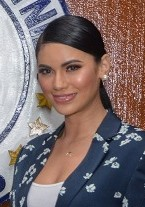
Gazini Ganados
Miss Universe Philippines 2019

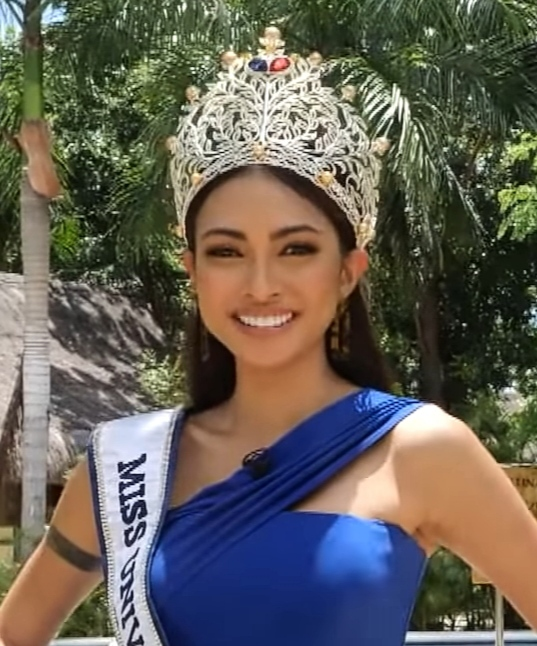
Beatrice Gomez
Miss Universe Philippines 2021

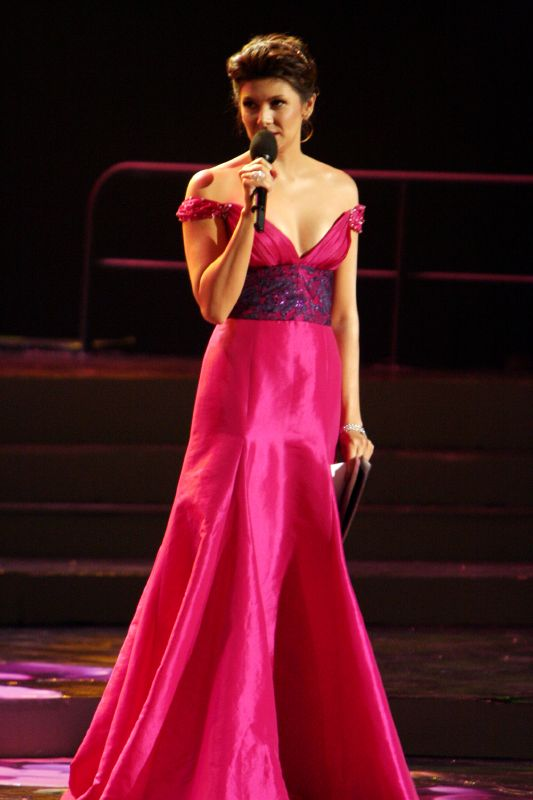
Charlene Gonzales
Binibining Pilipinas ― Universe 1994

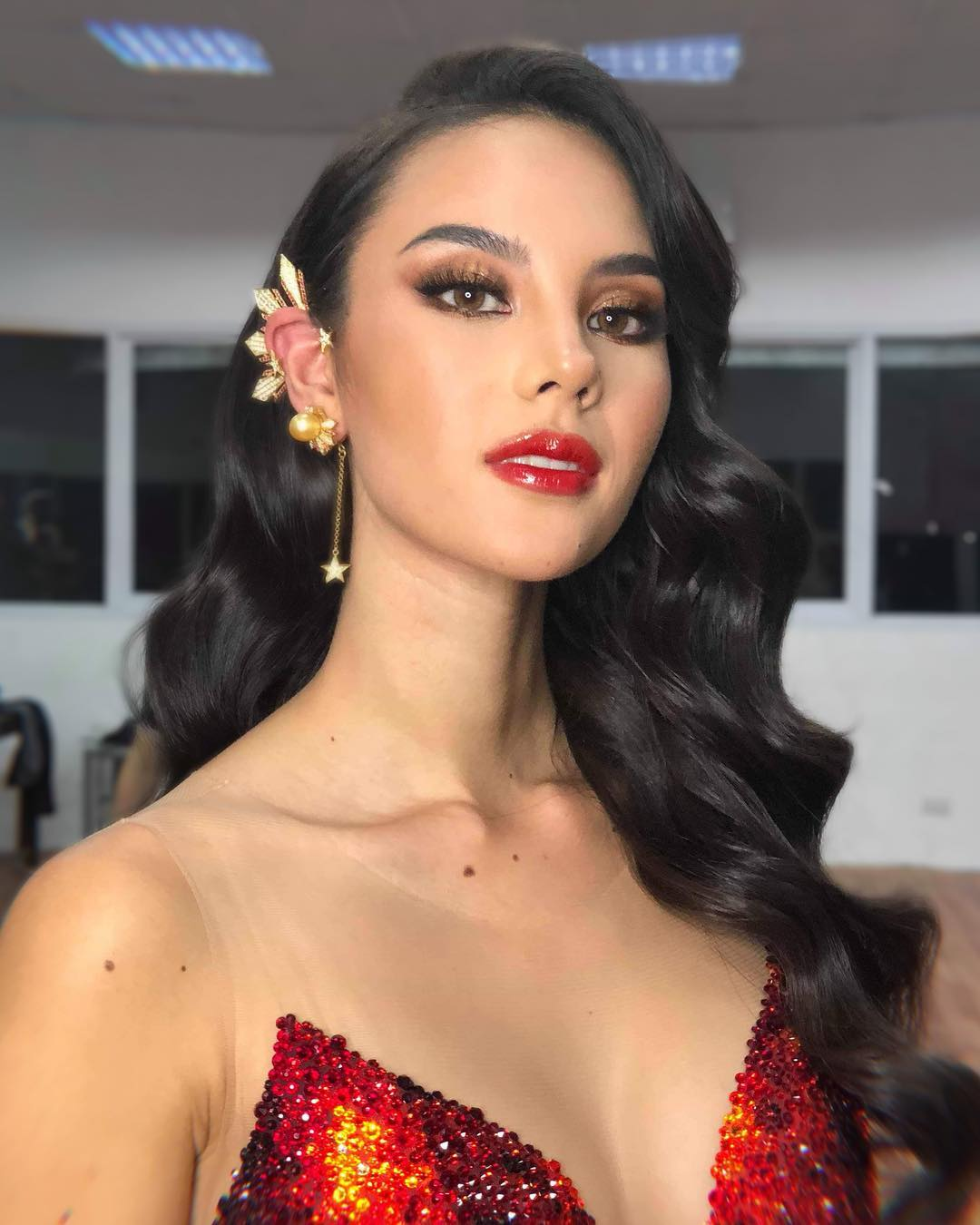
Catriona Gray
Miss Universe 2018

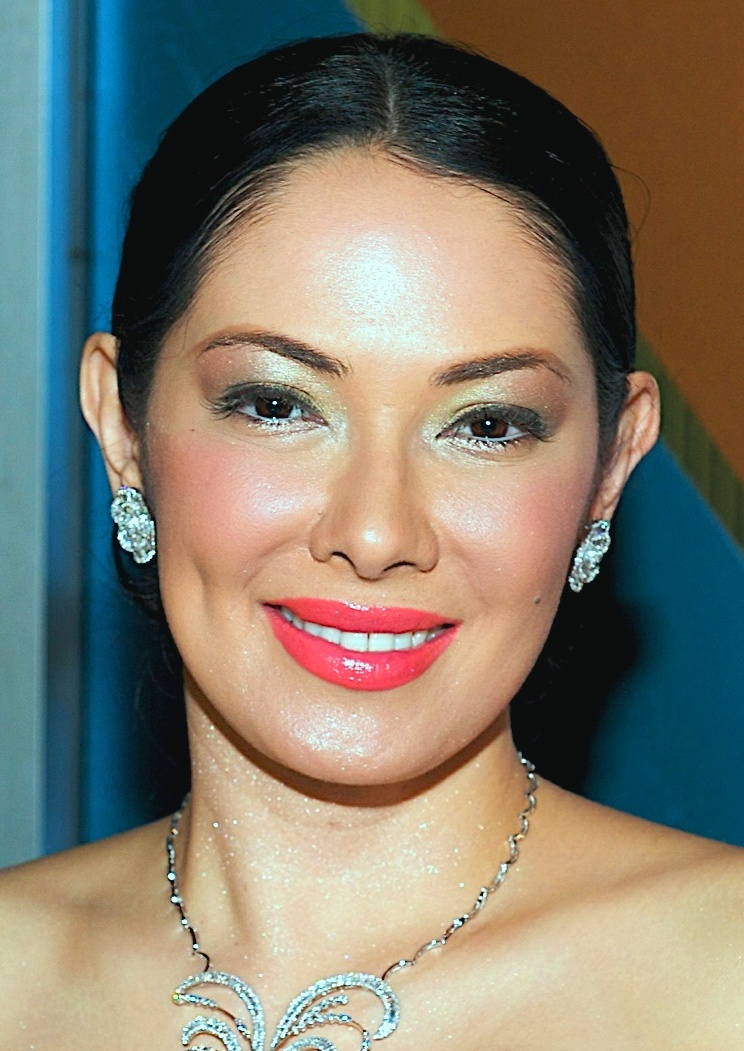
Ruffa Gutierrez
Miss World 1993 2nd Runner-up

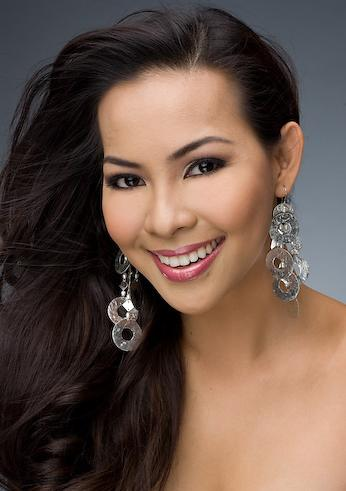
Jeanne Harn
Miss Philippines Earth 2007

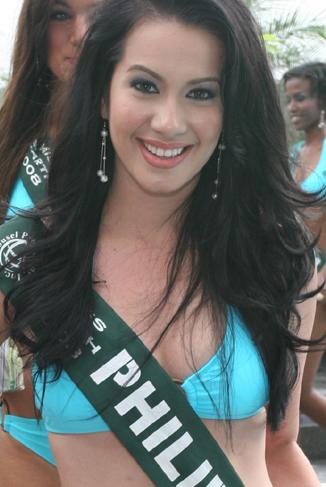
Karla Henry
Miss Earth 2008

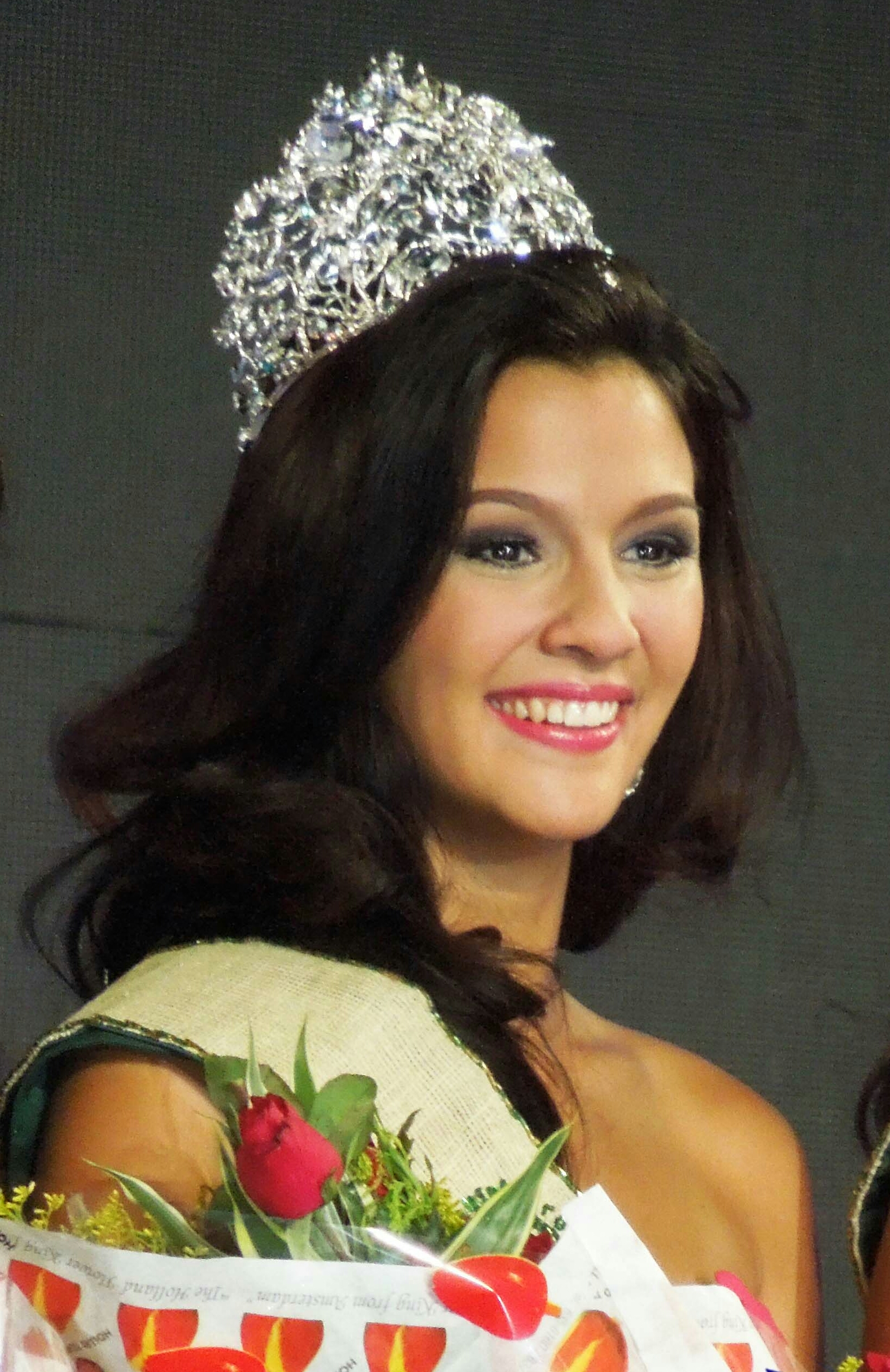
Jamie Herrell
Miss Earth 2014

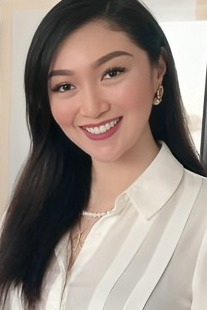
Karen Ibasco
Miss Earth 2017

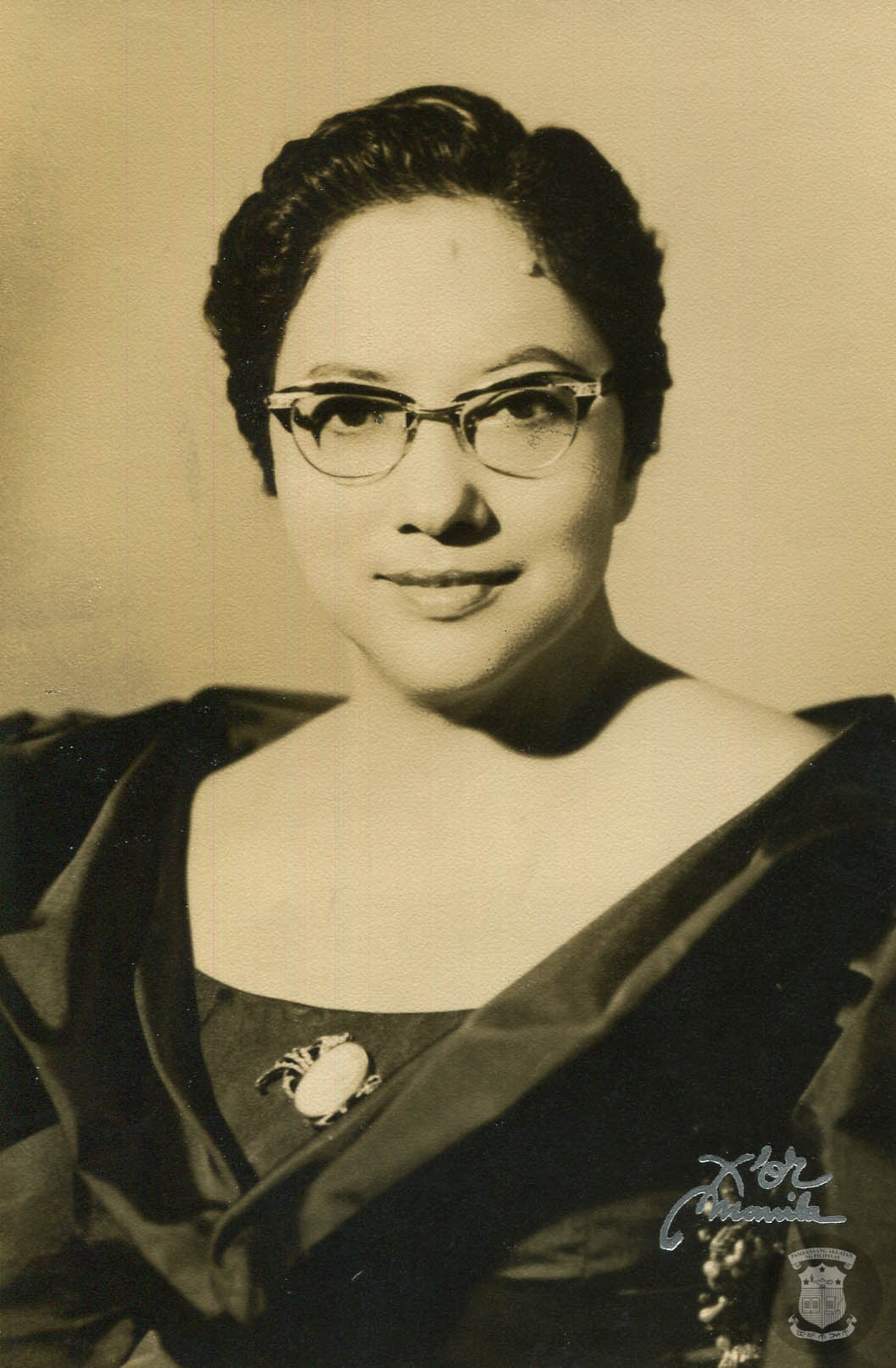
Maria Kalaw
Miss Philippines 1931

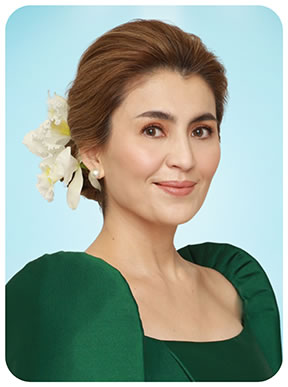
Yedda Kittilsvedt
Binibining Pilipinas ― International 1996

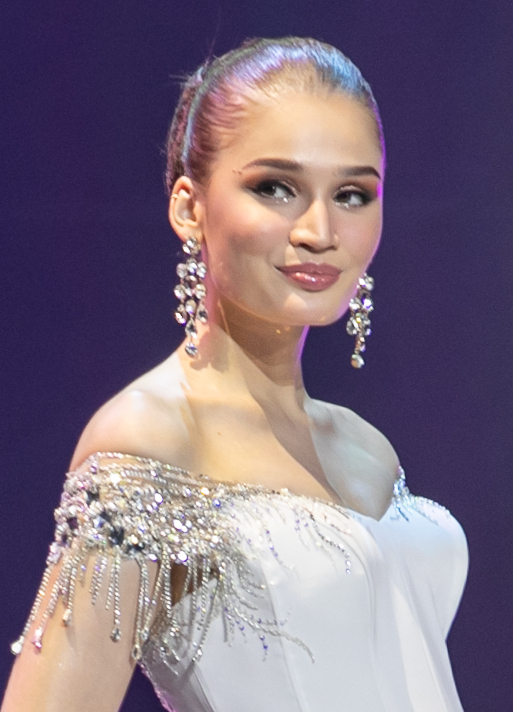
Anna Lakrini
The Miss Globe 2023 2nd Runner-up

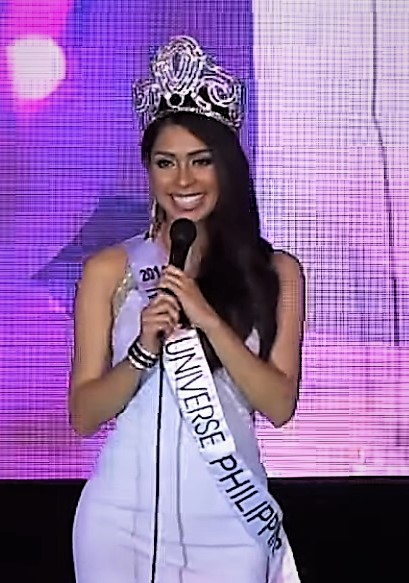
Mary Jean Lastimosa
Miss Universe Philippines 2014

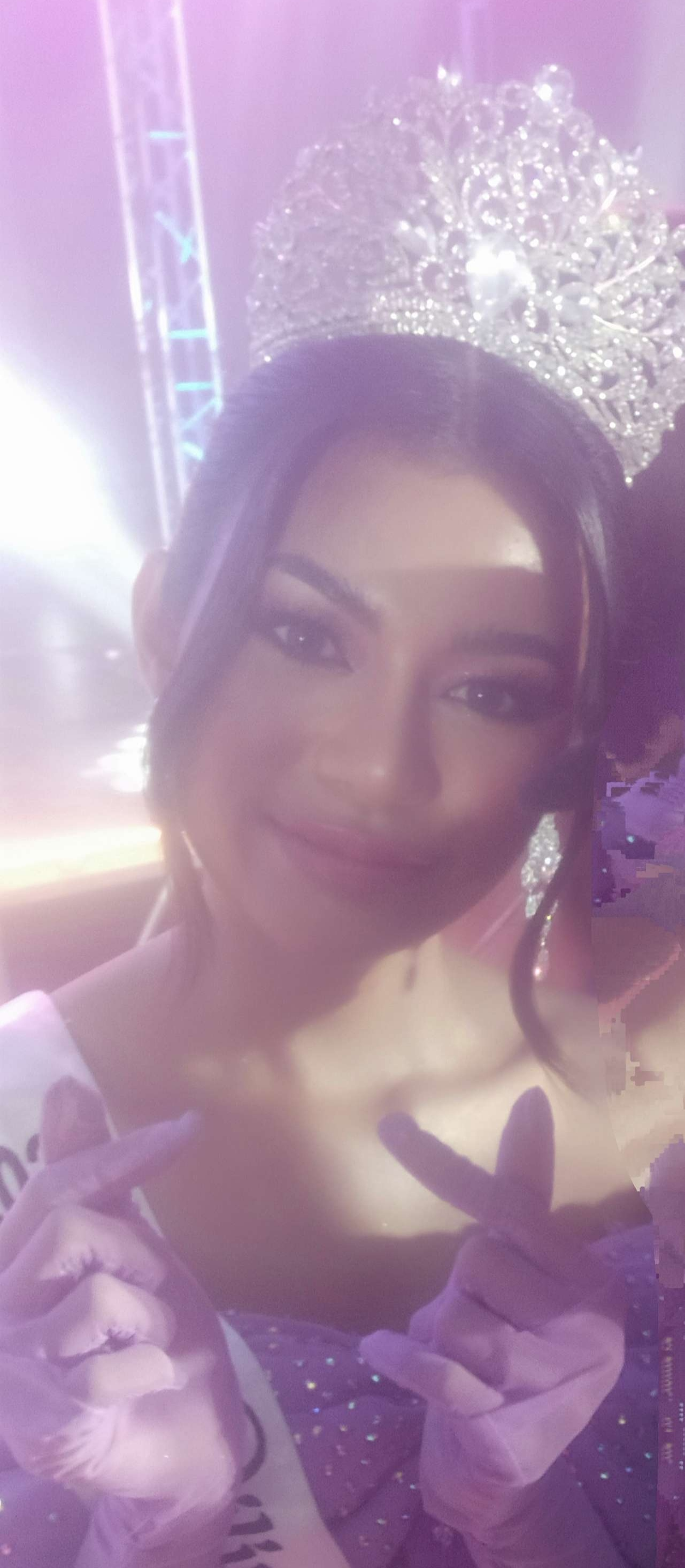
Angelica Lopez
Binibining Pilipinas ― International 2023

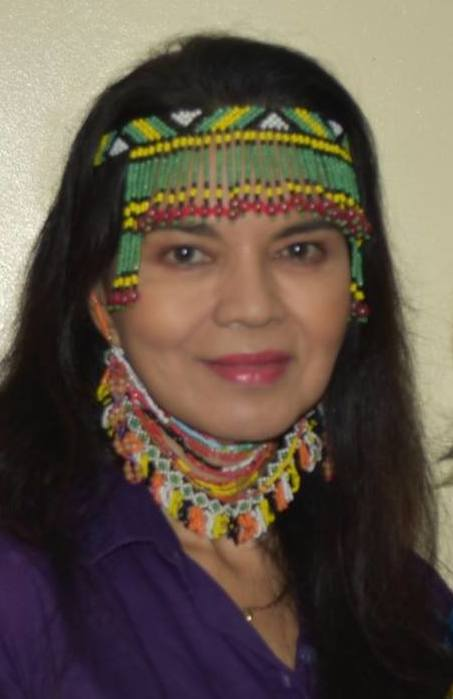
Maria Isabel Lopez
Binibining Pilipinas ― Universe 1982

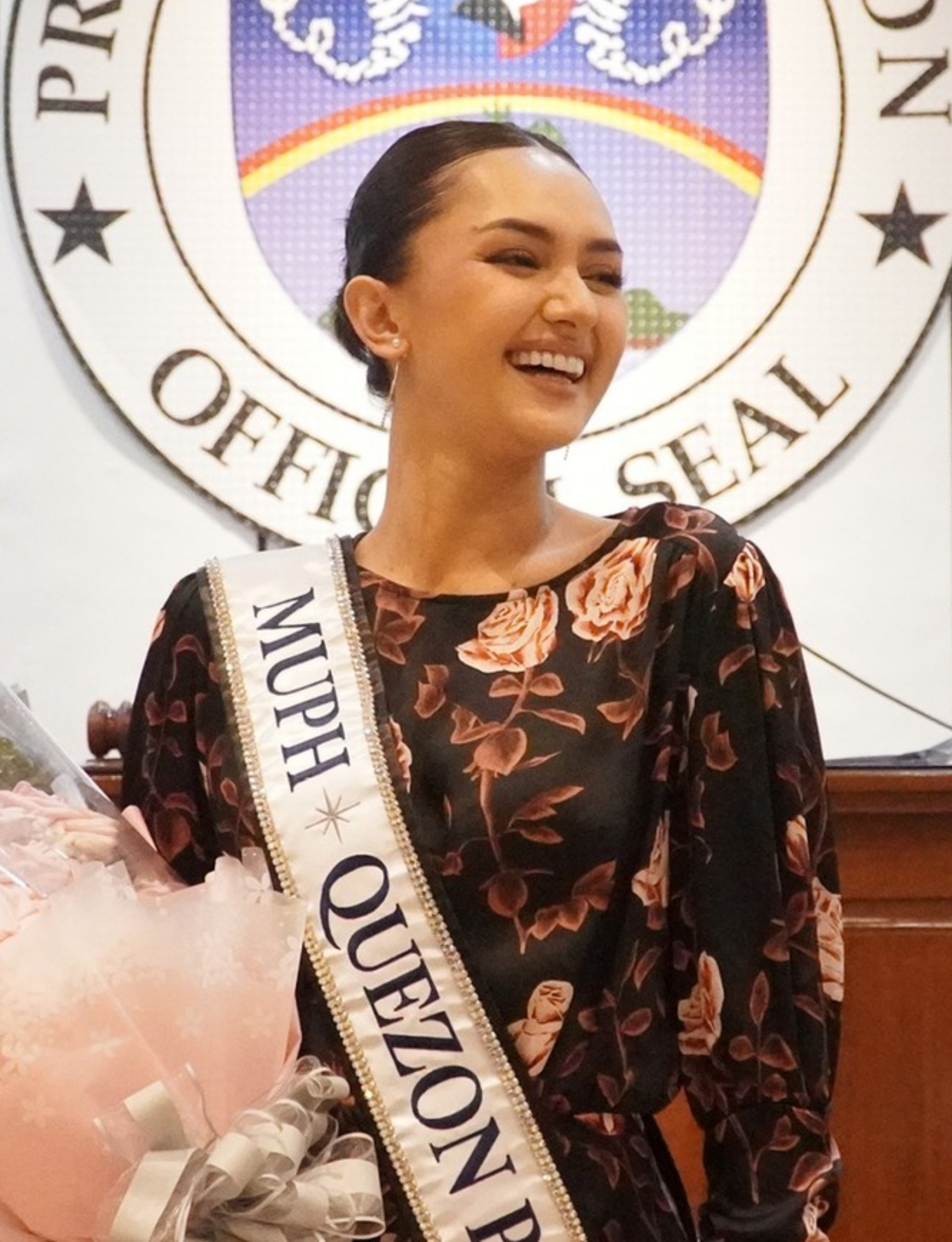
Ahtisa Manalo
Miss Universe Philippines 2025

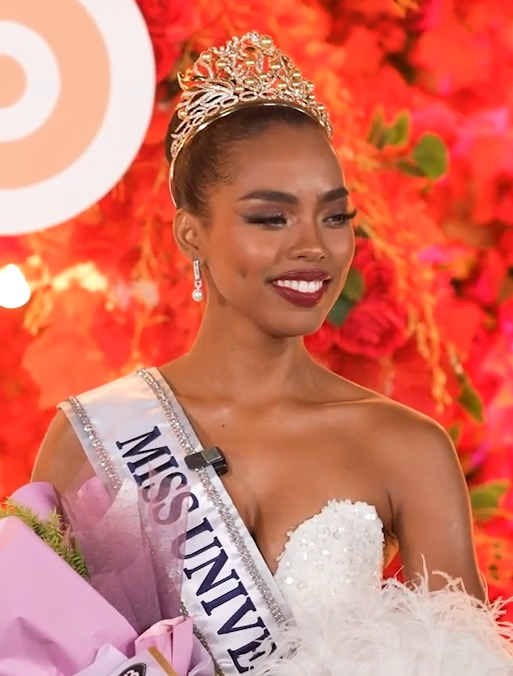
Chelsea Manalo
Miss Universe Philippines 2024

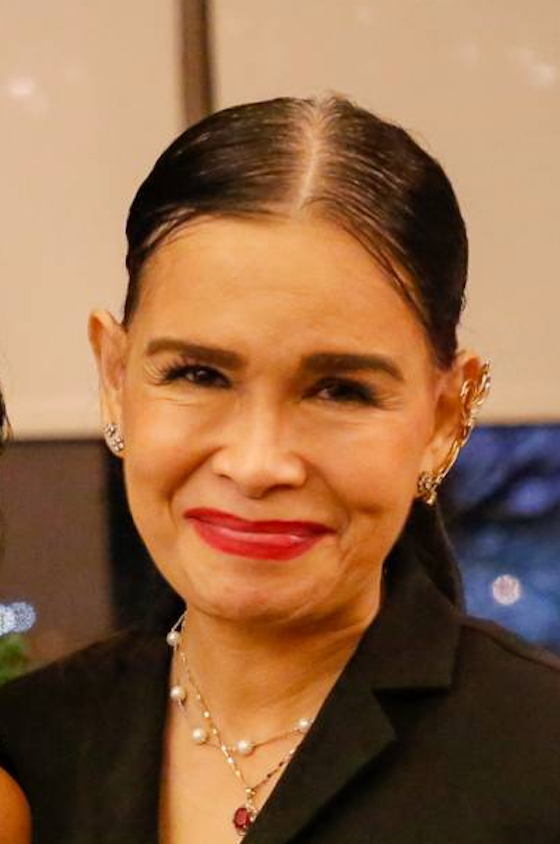
Melanie Marquez
Miss International 1979

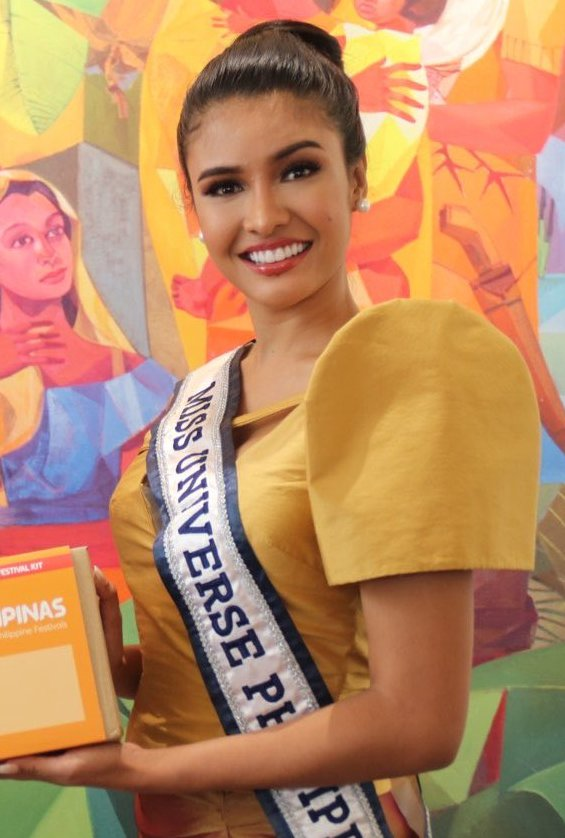
Rabiya Mateo
Miss Universe Philippines 2020

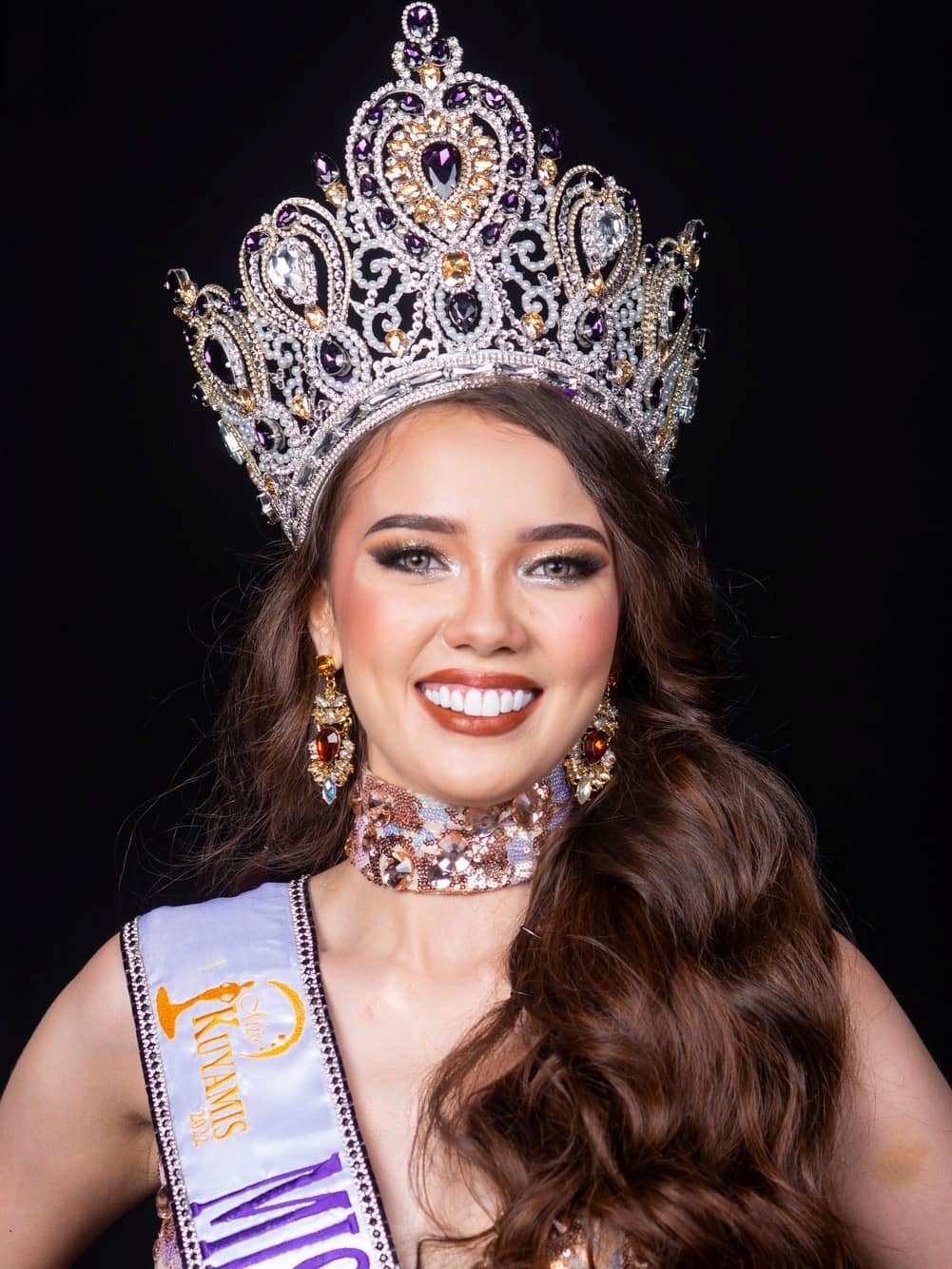
Annabelle Mae McDonnell
Miss Charm 2023 1st Runner-up

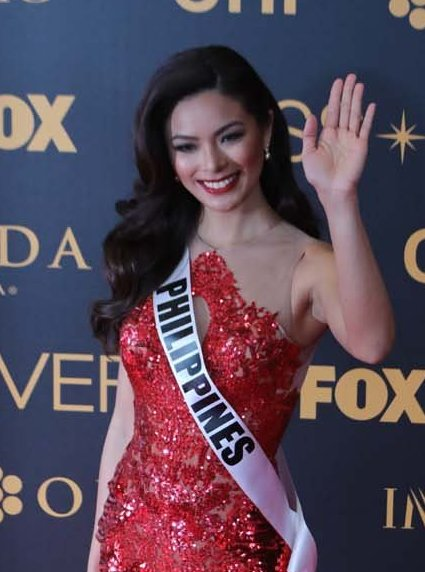
Maxine Medina
Miss Universe Philippines 2016

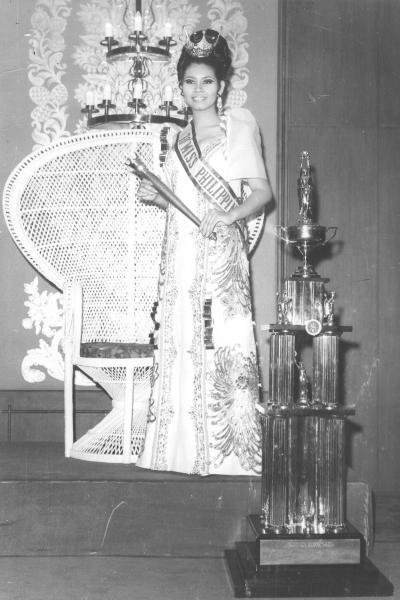
Feliza Teresa Miro
Miss Republic of the Philippines 1969

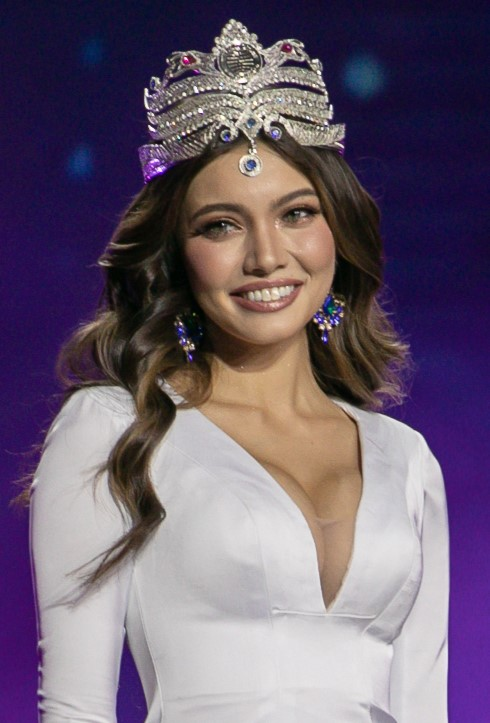
Maureen Montagne
The Miss Globe 2021

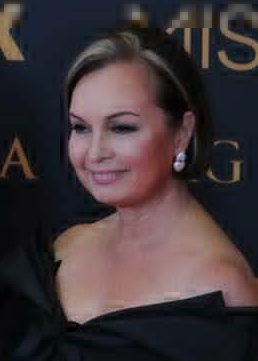
Margie Moran
Miss Universe 1973

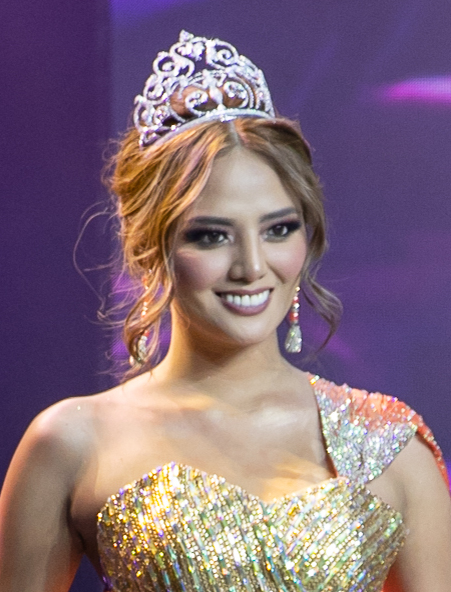
Cindy Obeñita
Miss Intercontinental 2021

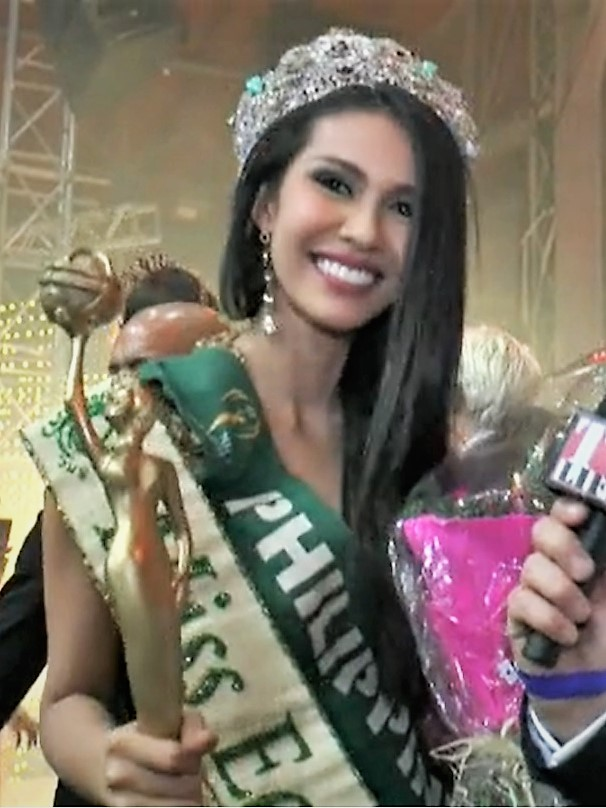
Angelia Ong
Miss Earth 2015

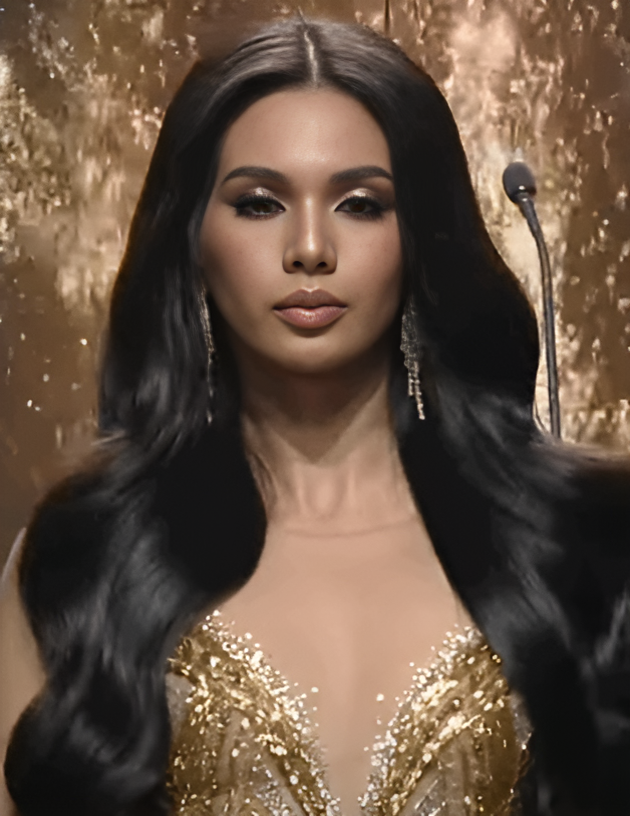
CJ Opiaza
Miss Grand International 2024

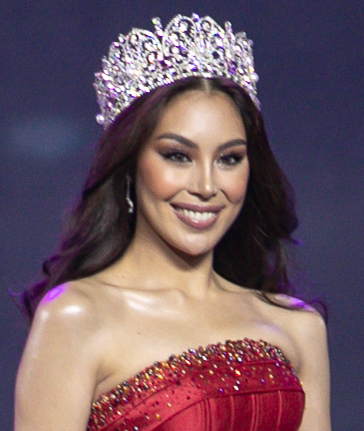
Dindi Pajares
Miss Supranational Philippines 2021

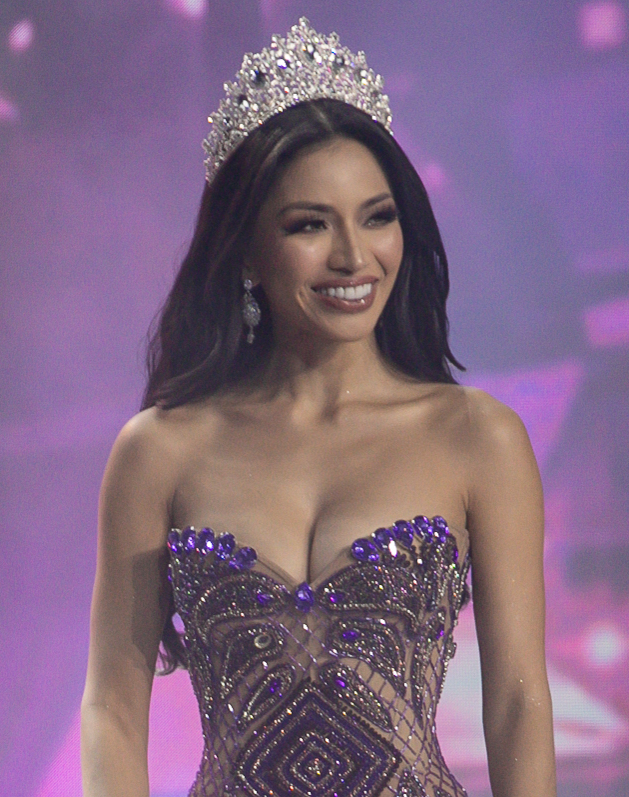
Samantha Panlilio
Binibining Pilipinas ― Grand International 2021

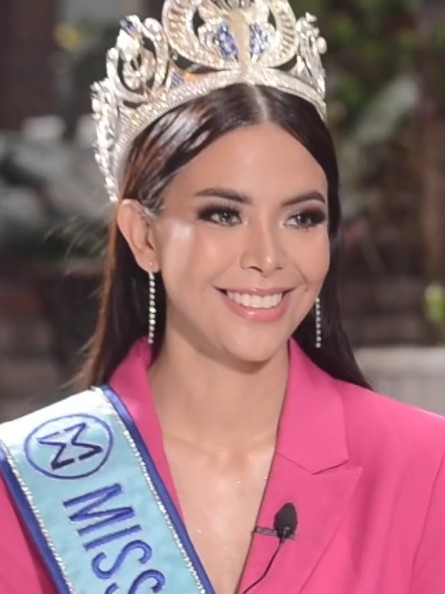
Tracy Perez
Miss World Philippines 2021

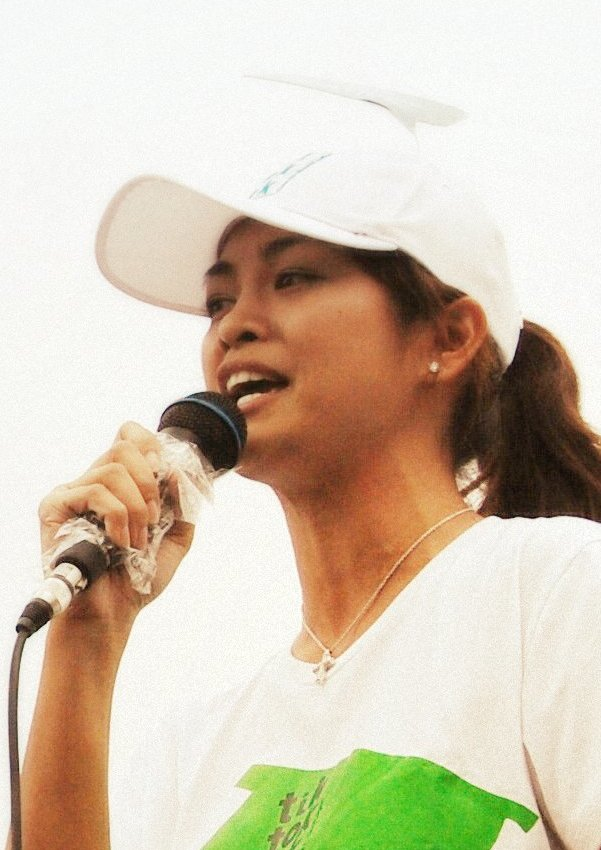
Miriam Quiambao
Miss Universe 1999 1st Runner-up

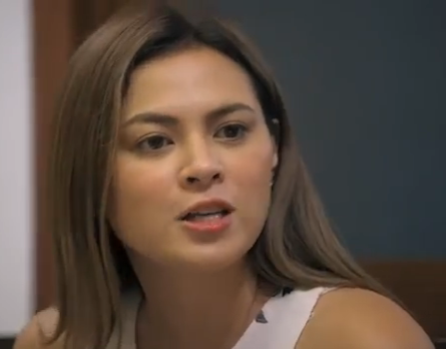
Lara Quigaman
Miss International 2005

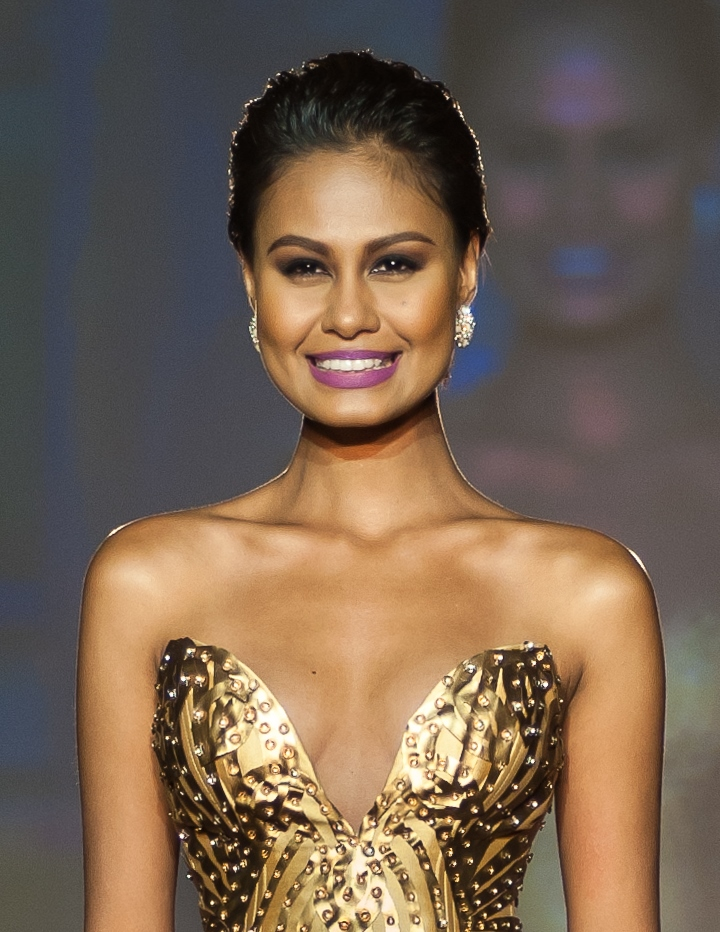
Venus Raj
Miss Universe 2010 4th Runner-up

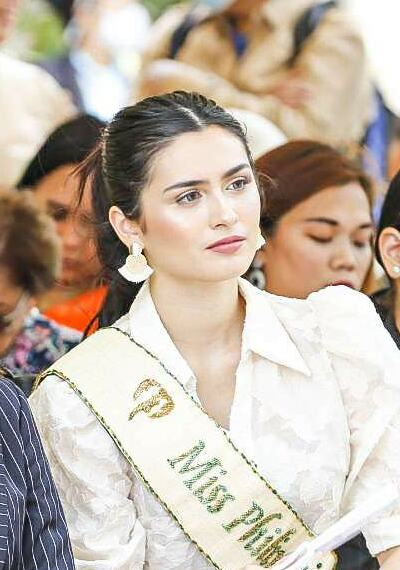
Jenny Ramp
Miss Philippines Earth 2022

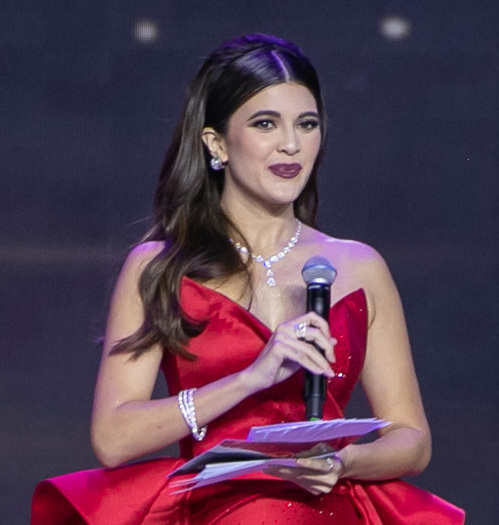
Katarina Rodriguez
Miss World Philippines 2018

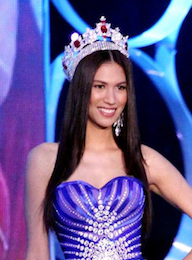
Gwendoline Ruais
Miss World 2011 1st Runner-up

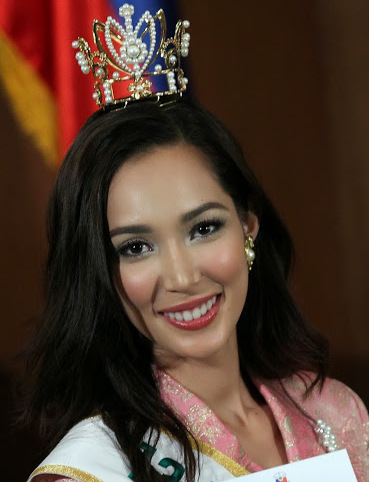
Bea Santiago
Miss International 2013

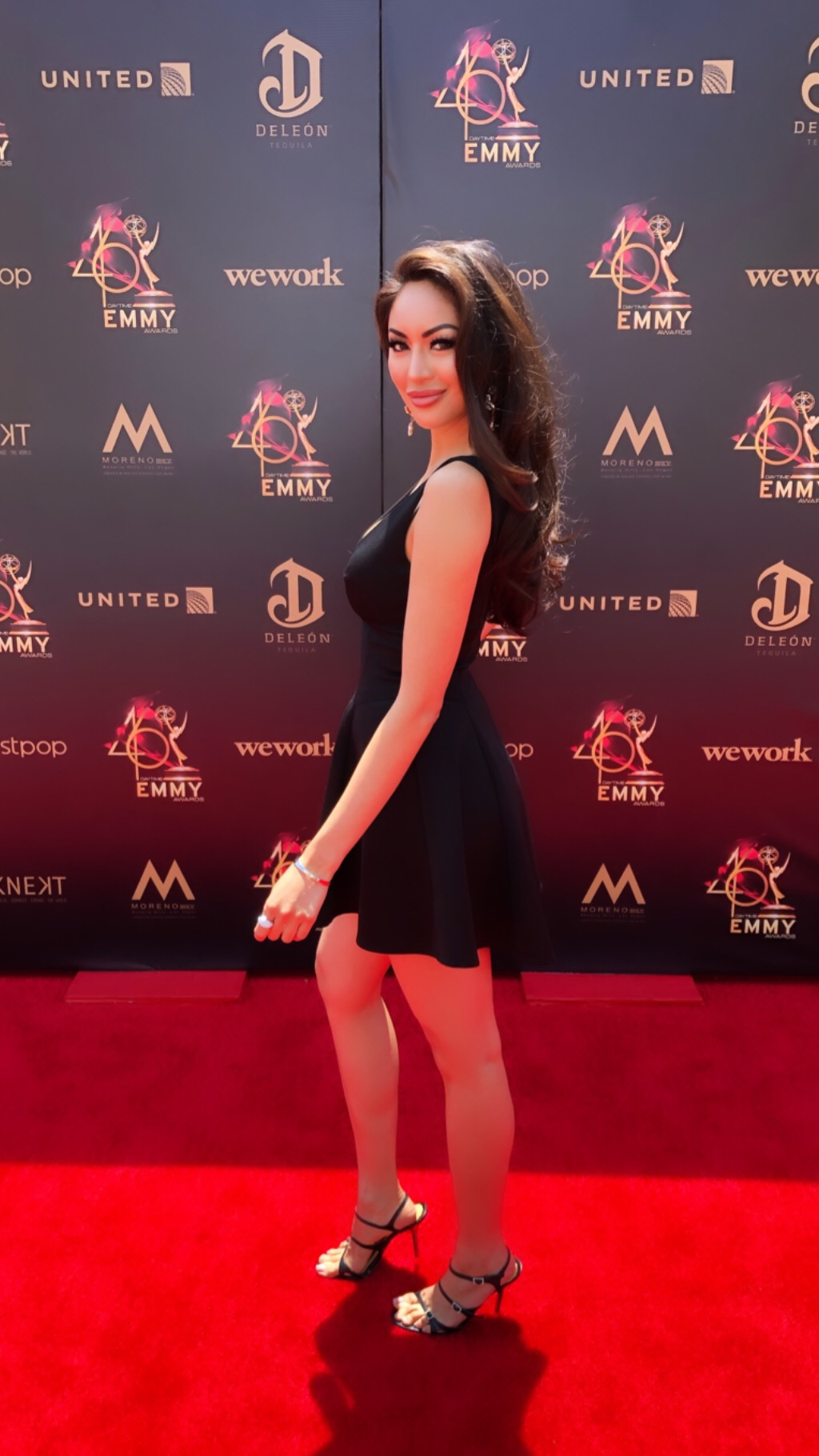
Riza Santos
Miss Global 2019 3rd Runner-up

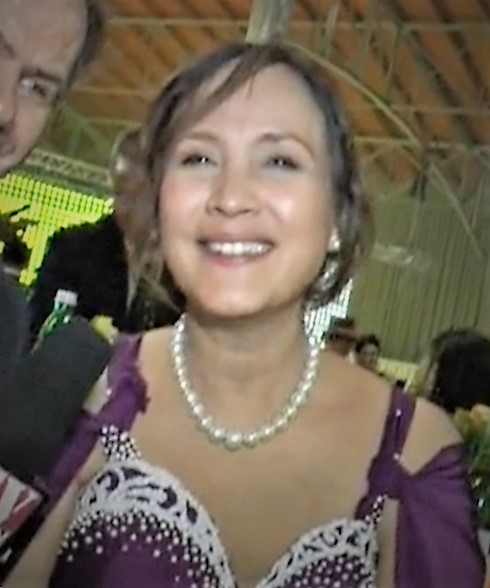
Lorraine Schuck
Miss Asia Quest 1979 1st runner-up

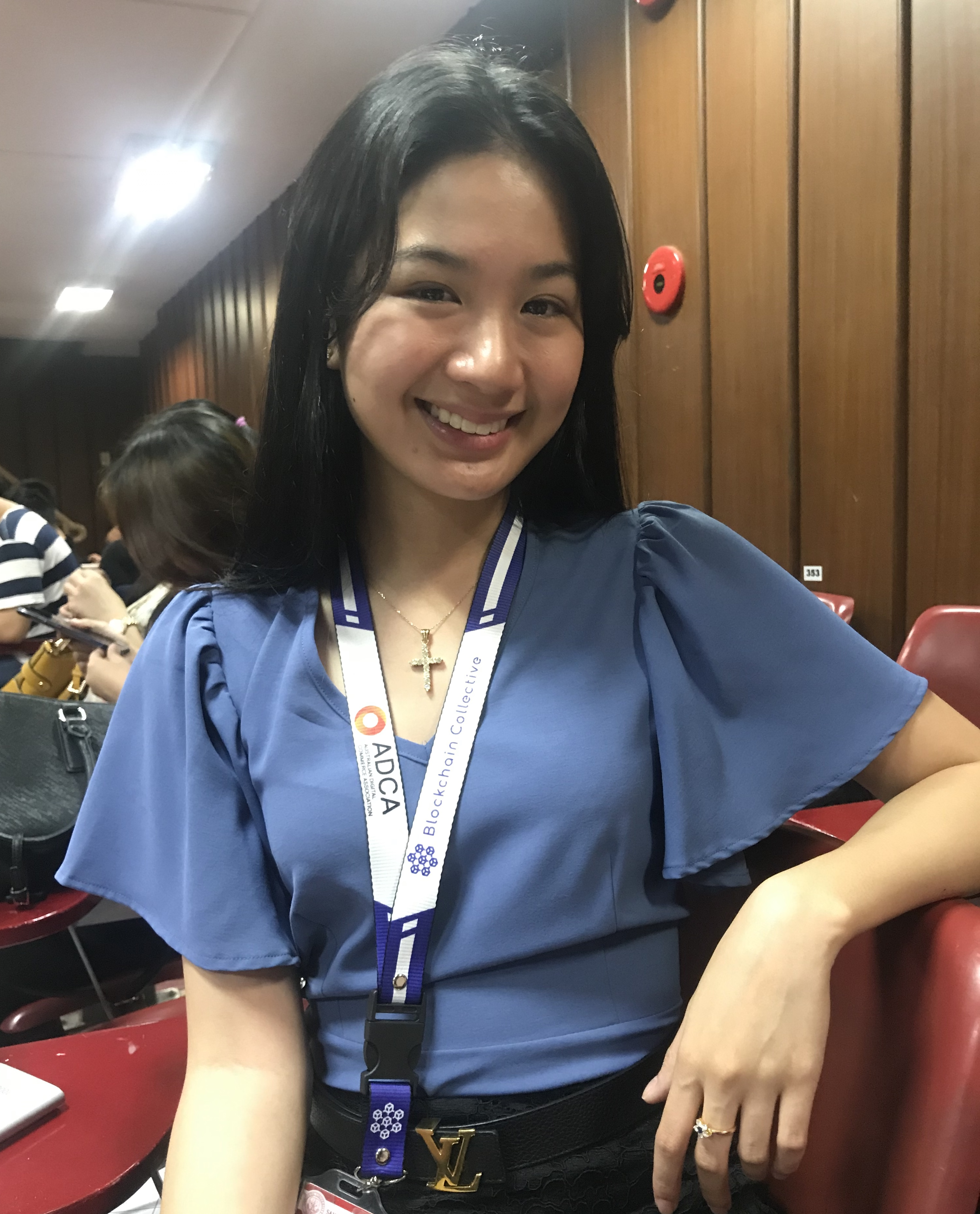
Sophia Senoron
Miss Multinational 2017

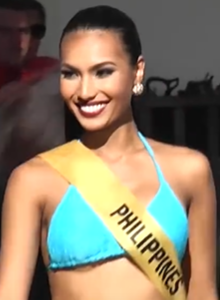
Parul Shah
Miss Grand International 2015 3rd Runner-up

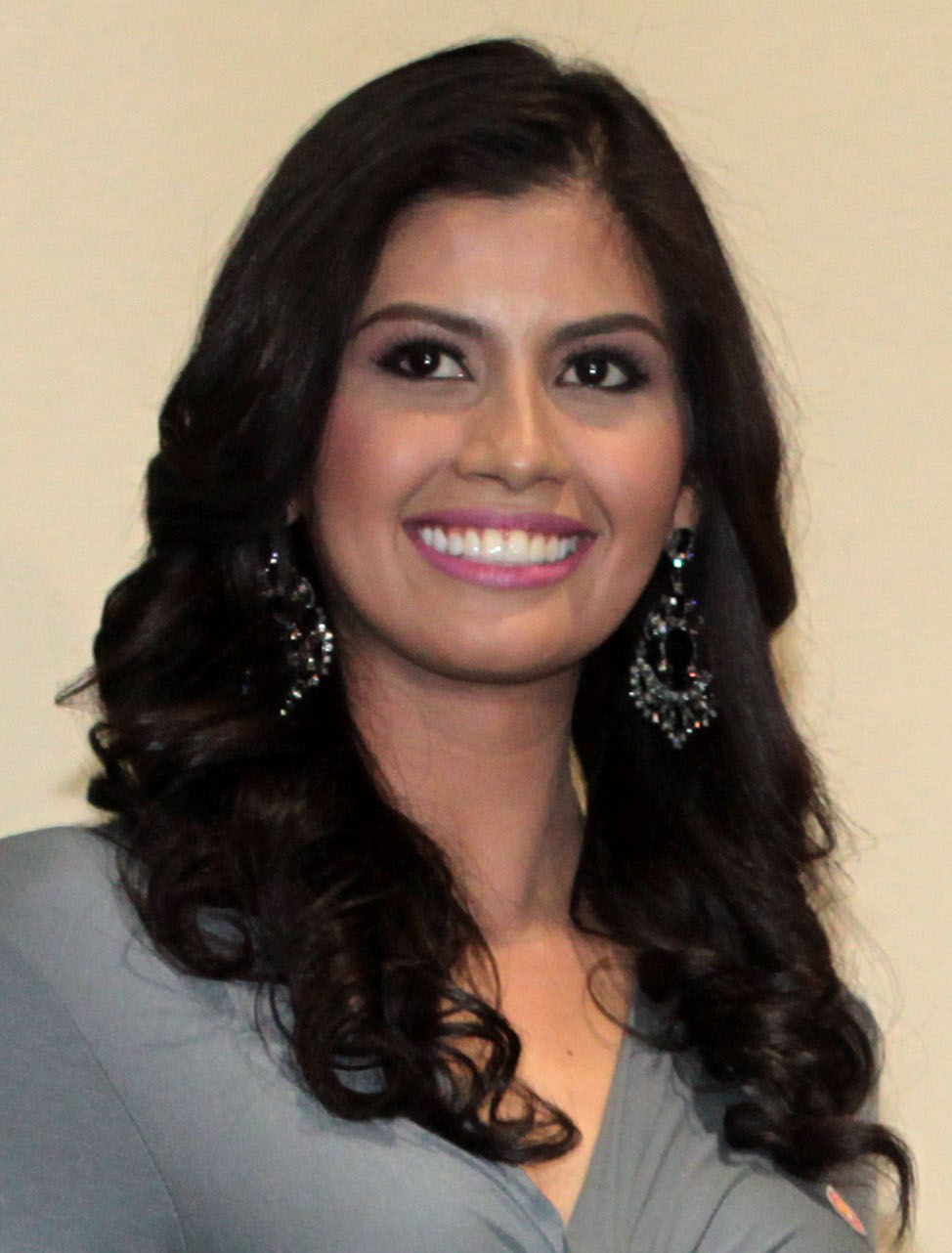
Shamcey Supsup
Miss Universe 2011 3rd Runner-up

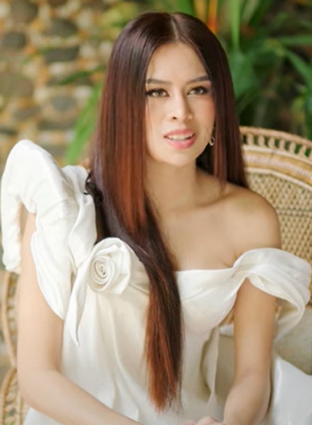
Roberta Tamondong
Miss Grand International 2022 5th Runner-up

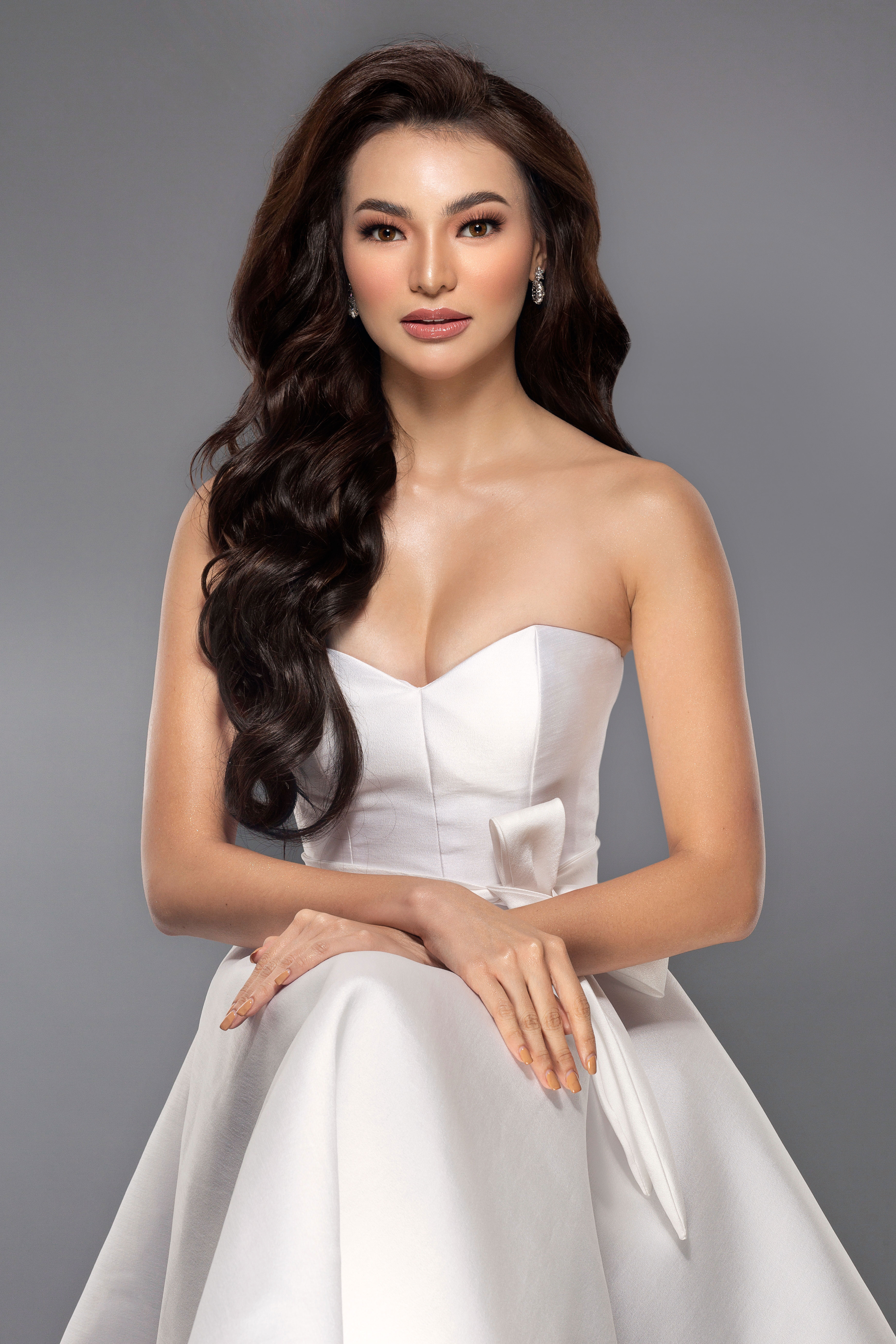
Emma Tiglao
Miss Grand International 2025

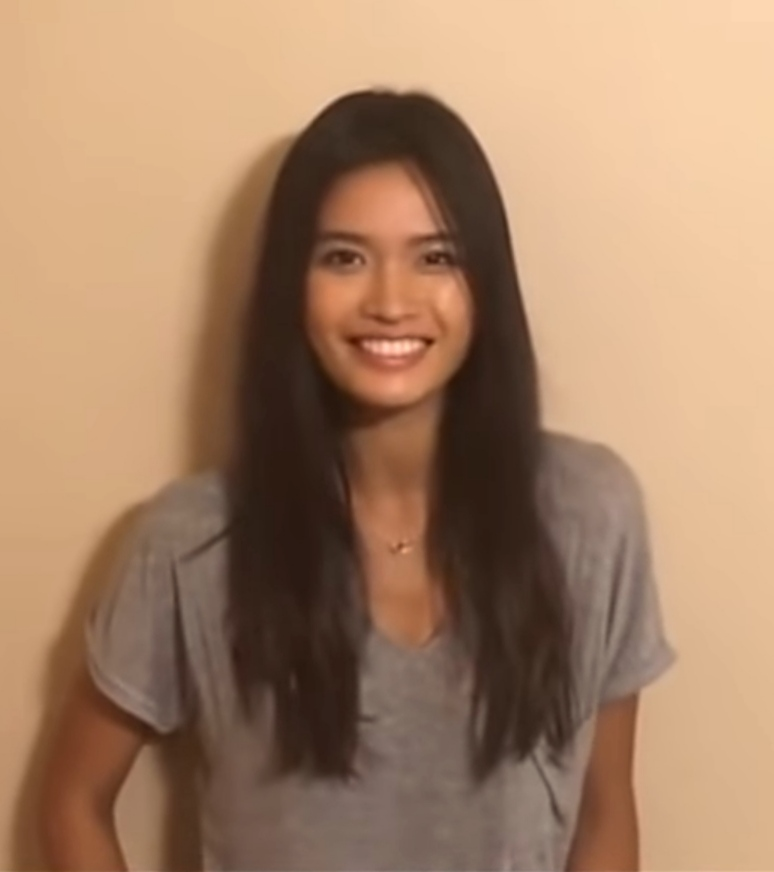
Janine Tugonon
Miss Universe 2012 1st Runner-up

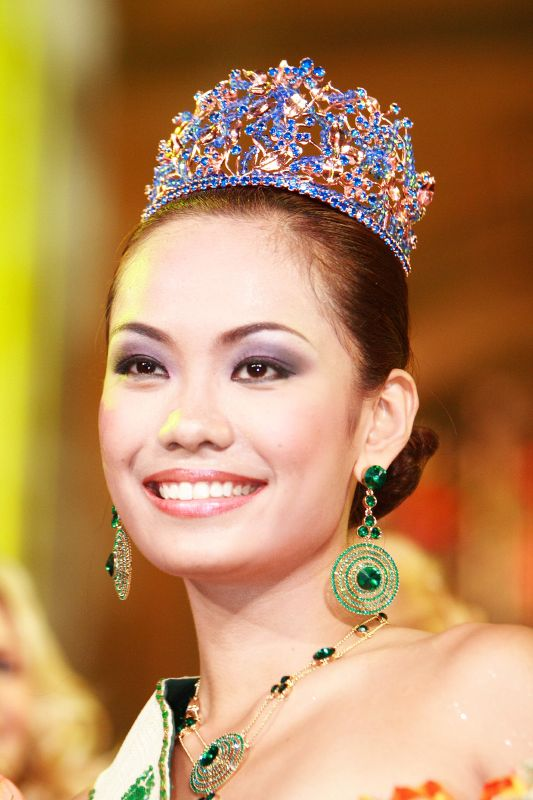
Cathy Untalan
Miss Earth – Water 2006

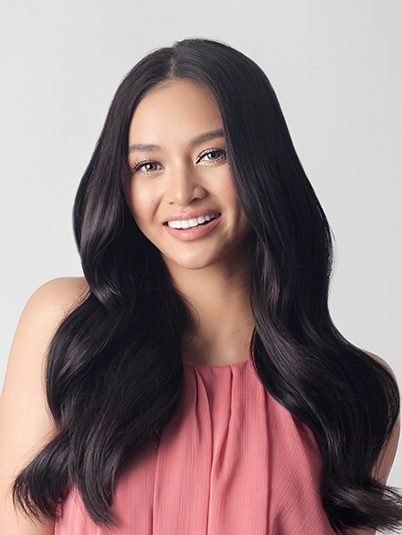
Kylie Verzosa
Miss International 2016

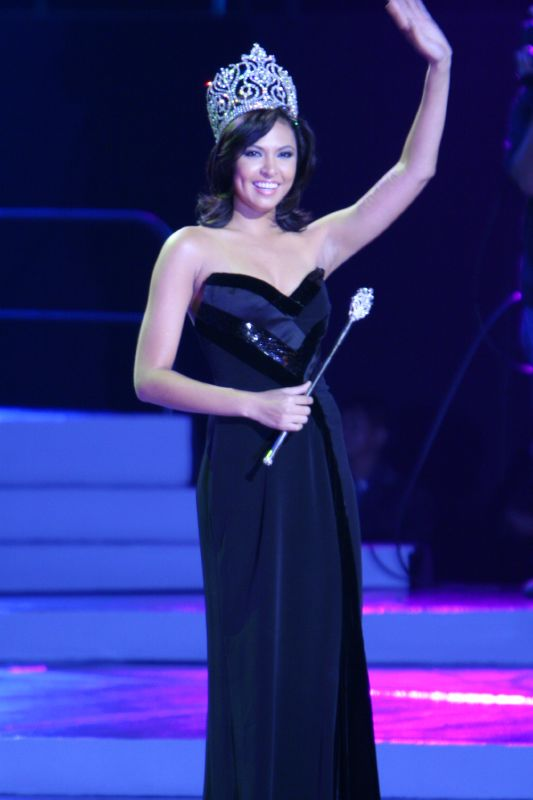
Maggie Wilson
Binibining Pilipinas ― World 2007

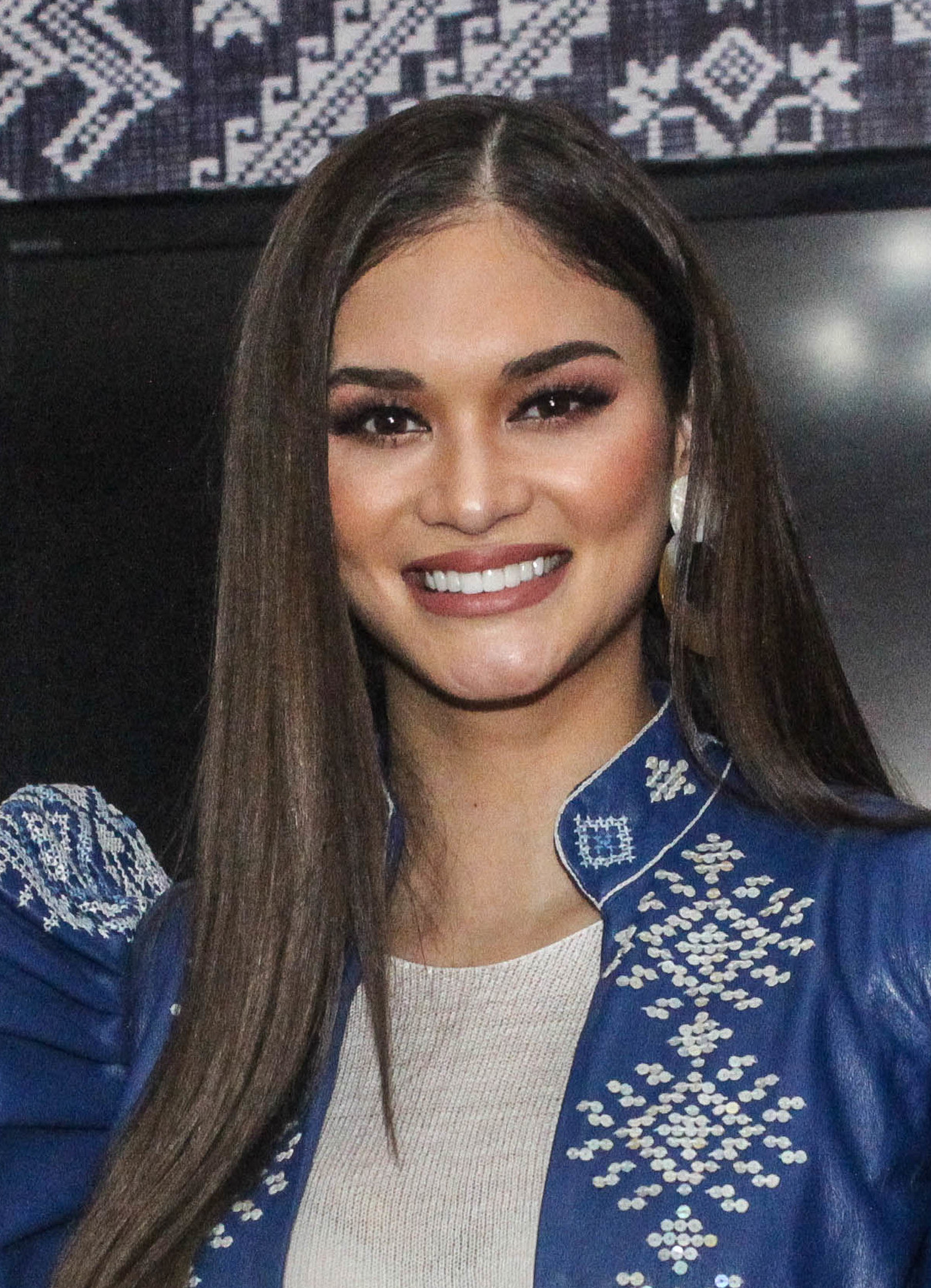
Pia Wurtzbach
Miss Universe 2015

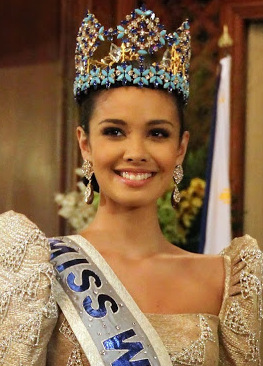
Megan Young
Miss World 2013
