= Binibining Pilipinas 1992 =

29th edition of Binibining Pilipinas

- Date: February 22, 1992
- Presenters: Apa Ongpin; Alice Dixson; Margarita Moran
- Venue: Araneta Coliseum, Quezon City, Philippines
- Broadcaster: GMA Network
- Entrants: 37
- Placements: 15
- Winner: Elizabeth Berroya
- Congeniality: Florenitna Losbanes
- Photogenic: Mariafe Garlit

Binibining Pilipinas 1992 was the 29th edition of Binibining Pilipinas. It took place at the Araneta Coliseum in Quezon City, Metro Manila, Philippines on February 22, 1992.

At the end of the event, Maria Lourdes Gonzalez crowned Elizabeth Berroya as Binibining Pilipinas Universe 1992, Patricia Betita crowned Jo-Anne Alivio as Binibining Pilipinas International 1992, while Selina Manalad crowned Marina Pura Benipayo as Binibining Pilipinas Maja 1992.

Starting this edition, the winners of the Binibining Pilipinas pageant will represent the Philippines in Miss Universe, Miss World, and Miss International after acquiring the franchise of Miss World. Gloria Diaz, Miss Universe 1969, crowned Marilen Espino as the first Binibining Pilipinas World.

A few days before her departure to South Africa, Marilen Espino contracted an illness which barred her from competing at Miss World 1992. Due to this, Marina Pura Benipayo was sent to compete at Miss World, replacing Espino. Espino replaced Benipayo at Miss Maja International, although the pageant was not held this year. However, both Espino and Benipayo retained their titles as Binibining Pilipinas World 1992 and Binibining Pilipinas Maja 1992, respectively.

== Results ==
Color keys

- The contestant did not place.
- The contestant was not able to compete in an international pageant.

Title	Contestant	International Placement
Binibining Pilipinas Universe 1992	Bb. #1 – Elizabeth Berroya	Unplaced - Miss Universe 1992
Binibining Pilipinas World 1992	Bb. #19 – Marilen Espino	Unable to fulfill her competition
Binibining Pilipinas International 1992	Bb. #12 – Jo-Anne Timothea Alivio	Unplaced - Miss International 1992
Binibining Pilipinas Maja 1992	Bb. #18 – Marina Pura Benipayo	Unplaced - Miss World 1992
1st runner-up	Bb. #2 – Hazel Huelves	
2nd runner-up	Bb. #31 – Michelle Buan	
Top 15	Bb. #4 – Geraldine Gonzalez; Bb. #5 – Cynthia Angelica de Jesus; Bb. #6 – Lourdelyn Parma; Bb. #9 – Viftra Burgos; Bb. #16 – Rosemarie Abad; Bb. #20 – Lizelle Eugenio; Bb. #27 – Mariafe Garlit; Bb. #28 – Mary Grace de Castro; Bb. #30 – Caroline Detaro	

=== Special awards ===
Award	Contestant
Miss Photogenic	Bb. #27 – Mariafe Garlit
Miss Friendship	Bb. #24 – Florenitna Losbanes
Miss Talent	Bb. #36 – Cindy Suyat
Best in Swimsuit	Bb. #1 – Elizabeth Berroya
Best in Evening Gown	Bb. #2 – Hazel Huelves
Miss Sunsilk Hair	Bb. #19 – Marilen Espino
Miss Lux	Bb. #18 – Marina Benipayo
Miss Pond's Fresh Face	Bb. #2 – Hazel Huelves

== Contestants ==
Thirty-seven contestants competed for the four titles.

No.	Contestant	Age (Note: Ages at the time of the pageant)	Locality
1	Elizabeth Berroya	18	Quezon City
2	Hazel Huelves	20	Manila
3	Estella White	18	Quezon City
4	Geraldine Gonzalez	20	San Pablo,
5	Cynthia Angelica de Jesus	21	Quezon City
6	Lourdelyn Parma	18	Las Piñas
7	Geraldine Bondoc	25	Pasig
8	Josephine Llorca	19	Marikina
9	Viftra Burgos	22	Pasig
10	Goldie Ann Burns	18	Makati
11	Ritzie Alcantara	19	Manila
12	Jo-Anne Timothea Alivio	20	Lucban
13	Maria Kristina Rubio	19	Canlubang, Laguna
14	Arsenia Legaspi	22	Meycauayan
15	Maria Carmen Cabiles	20	Davao City
16	Rosemarie Abad	23	Pasay
17	Mary Grace Molina	19	Obando
18	Marina Pura Benipayo	23	Quezon City
19	Marilen Espino	24	Angeles City
20	Lizelle Bernardo Eugenio	19	Cavite
21	Cherry Pink Mabagos	17	Bulacan
22	Irynn Aquino	19	Santa Mesa, Manila
23	Evangeline Carandang	18	Tanauan
24	Florentina Losbanes	22	Iloilo City
25	Criselda Sarabuno	18	Meycauayan
26	Michelle delos Santos	20	Manila
27	Mariafe Garlit	21	Manila
28	Mary Grace de Castro	20	Parañaque
29	Janet de Leon	19	Taytay, Rizal
30	Caroline Detaro	21	San Pedro
31	Michelle Buan	17	Manila
32	Cecille Pontillas	17	Meycauayan
33	Evangeline Gregory	20	Navotas
34	Imelda Imperial	24	Makati
35	Ava Angela Arenas	17	Quezon City
36	Cindy Suyat	20	San Nicolas
37	Jocelyn Casabuena	25	Atimonan
