= AMA University =

Private university in Quezon City, Philippines

- Pamantasang AMA (Filipino)
- Former names: AMA Institute of Computer Studies (1980–2001); AMA Computer College
- Motto: Never Rest On One's Laurels; QualITy education that works!
- Type: Private, Nonsectarian, For-profit higher education institution
- Established: October 20, 1980; 46 years ago
- Founder: Dr. Amable R. Aguiluz V
- Academic affiliations: Philippine Association of Colleges and Universities (PACU); Accreditation Board for Engineering and Technology (ABET)
- Chairman: Dr. Amable R. Aguiluz V
- President: Amable C. Aguiluz IX
- Undergraduates: Approx. 150,000 (entire AMA Education System)
- Location: Maxima St., Villa Arca 1 Subdivision Barangay Baesa, Quezon City, Metro Manila, Philippines; 14°39′53.46″N 121°0′47.63″E
- Campus: Urban Main Campus: Quezon City Metro Manila
- Alma Mater song: The AMA Hymn
- Colors: Crimson red and White
- Sporting affiliations: NAASCU
- Mascot: Titans
- Website: www.ama.edu.ph
- Location in Metro Manila Location in Luzon Location in the Philippines

AMA University, also known as AMA Computer University (AMACU) or simply AMA, is a private, nonsectarian, for-profit university in Quezon City, Philippines.

== History ==
=== AMA Institute of Computer Studies ===
AMA University and its sister school AMA Computer College (AMACC) were founded by Amable R. Aguiluz V, who named them after the initials of his father's name, Amable Mendoza Aguiluz Sr.

Aguiluz founded the AMA Institute of Computer Studies with the first computer school located along Shaw Boulevard on October 20, 1980. Back then, AMA Institute of Computer Studies offered only short-term courses in Electronic Data Processing Fundamentals, Basic Programming, and Technology Career. Three students enrolled at the AMA Institute of Computer Studies during the first semester.

=== AMA Computer College, branches and sister schools ===
University Entrance gate in Quezon City

AMA Computer College was created in June 1981. It extended its services through a four-year Bachelor of Science degree program in Computer Science. With only a handful of students in its first year of operation, the AMACC student population rose from 600 in 1983 to 2,000 in 1985 on its first official campus in Makati. Shortly after, it established its main campus in Quezon City. Two provincial campuses were then founded in Cebu City and Davao City.

The AMA Computer Learning Center (ACLC) was established in 1987 and the AMA Telecommunication & Electronic Learning Center in 1996. The former offers short-course programs for professionals and two-year technical/vocational courses for those who wish to acquire employment skills. The latter concentrates on telecommunication, electronics, and related technologies.

=== Elevation to university ===
AMA Computer College of Quezon City became AMA Computer University or AMA University following the conferment of university status by the Philippine government's Commission on Higher Education (CHED) on August 20, 2001.

In 2003, AMA Computer University partnered with Carnegie Mellon University's iCarnegie to use its curriculum and courses through e-learning. Previously, iCarnegie had approached STI for the agreement, but opted to stick with AMACU instead.

=== Overseas AMA Computer College campuses ===
In 2003, AMA Education system brokered a partnership with the government of Bahrain to establish the AMA International University in Manama.

=== Athletic programs ===
In 2001, AMA joined the newly created National Athletic Association of Schools, Colleges and Universities (NAASCU).

=== Political affiliations ===
Amable Aguiluz V was Joseph Estrada's political endorser in the 1998 Presidential elections. Aguiluz resigned from the Commission in November 1999 due to a controversial purchase of equipment by the commission from a subsidiary of the AMA Group of Companies.

Aguiluz's father Amable Aguiluz Sr. was Diosdado Macapagal's friend and Aguiluz Sr. served as chairman and auditor-general of the Commission on Audit in the 1960s. Gloria Macapagal Arroyo was invited to AMA's sponsored political rallies. In 1995, Arroyo attended a political rally in AMA when she ran for re-election as senator. Arroyo attended all graduation rites for AMA from 2002 to 2005. Arroyo cited AMA for not participating in cause oriented and student activist groups. Arroyo appointed Aguiluz as Presidential Adviser for the Middle East.

== Programs ==
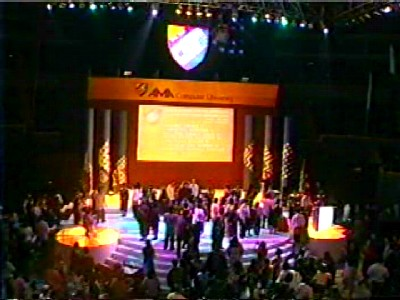
First graduation ceremony as a University in Quezon City, May 2002.

=== Colleges ===
- College of Computer Studies
- College of Engineering
- College of Business Administration and Accountancy
- College of Arts and Sciences
- College of Education

== Branches ==
AMA Computer College has 41 campuses nationwide under the AMA University and Colleges umbrella. Only the main campus of AMA in Project 8 is accredited with a University status; all else are under study for proper tertiary status. Student population mainly determine the longevity of the campuses.

Metro Manila	Northern and Central Luzon	Southern Luzon	Visayas	Mindanao
Caloocan, Fairview Quezon City, Las Piñas, Mandaluyong, Makati, Manila, Parañaque, Pasig, Quezon City (Main Campus – "AMA University")	Angeles City, Baguio, Cabanatuan, Dagupan, Laoag, Malolos, Olongapo, La Union, Pampanga, Bataan, Tarlac, Santiago, Tuguegarao	Batangas, Biñan, Calamba, Cavite, East Rizal, Santa Cruz, Legazpi, Lipa, Lucena, Naga	Bacolod, Cebu City, Dumaguete, Iloilo City, Tacloban	Cagayan de Oro, Cotabato City, Davao City, General Santos, Zamboanga City

== Member schools ==
The AMA Education System has a number of member schools.

- AMA Computer College are educational institutions across the Philippines that offer the same programs as AMACU.
- AMA International University is a partnership between the government of Bahrain and AMA Education System serving AMA's ICT programs in the Arab Region.
- AMA Computer Learning Center (ACLC College) offers shorter Information Technology-related programs.
- ABE International Business College offers Business Administration, Hotel and Restaurant Management, Tourism, and Information Technology.
- St. Augustine School of Nursing offers short medicine-related programs like caregiving.
- Norwegian Maritime Academy offers maritime-related courses like marine engineering.
- AMA School of Medicine offers medicine-related courses like nursing.
- AMA Basic Education offers basic education programs.
- Delta Air International Aviation Academy offers studies in aviation.

== Issues ==
=== School principal case resolution ===
On January 23, 2007, the Supreme Court affirmed the decision of the NLRC regarding the dismissal of a high school principal.

A high school principal was promoted on May 13, 1996, but an incident four days later led to her dismissal. A cashier at the company, carried a brown envelope containing PhP 47,299.34 to the comfort room of the school. While inside, she placed the envelope on top of the (toilet bowl) tank. After she left the room, she realized the envelope was left behind, hence she returned to the comfort room, but the envelope was already gone. The incident was reported to the area director, who told that the only person she recalled entering the comfort room after her was the school principal. Investigation of the school principal was ordered. Thereafter, she was brought to the barangay office and the incident was entered in its blotter. On May 20, 1996, she was suspended.

School officials served the principal several notices to appear during the hearings and to submit her written explanation, but the hearings were always cancelled. On June 19, 1996, AMA dismissed the principal on the ground of loss of trust and confidence. On June 21, 1996, school officials sent her another notice directing her to appear on June 27, 1996, hearing and to submit a written explanation. The hearing was, again, cancelled. On July 1, 1996, AMA finally terminated her employment.

On August 14, 1996, Garay filed a complaint for her dismissal and on September 14, 1998, NLRC Labor Arbiter Eduardo Carpio rendered judgment. He ruled that there was no material and direct evidence to show that the employee took the collections. NLRC ordered AMA to immediately reinstate her to her former or substantially equal position and pay her backwages computed in the amount of P300,000.00 (July 1, 1996, to December 31, 1998 = 30 months. P10,000.00 x 30 months = P300,000.00), moral damages of PhP 100,000.00 and exemplary damages of PhP 50,000.00.

=== Student case resolution ===
On November 10, 2004, the Regional Trial Court dismissed the case against 48 students and granted the students' motion to discontinue the proceedings after getting assurance from the school administration that they can continue with their studies. The students were ordered dismissed by school management October 4, 2004, for holding a protest rally in front of the school.

The students were dismissed from the school by the area director, school director and the school's disciplinary board after they held a protest rally in front of the school campus without the necessary permit. They said that the dismissal of the students was based on a resolution dated October 9 issued by Student Disciplinary Tribunal, which states that holding of rallies or any related activities without the necessary permit from an authorized school officer is a major offense that merits dismissal as provided for in the student handbook.

The students filed a 13-page civil suit with damages against the school for dismissing them. They also claimed their dismissal was null and void and violates their freedom of expression as enshrined in the 1987 Philippine Constitution. They said they held the rally to show support for the preventive suspension of several regular teachers, the implementation of the webcast teaching system and other unresolved issues regarding miscellaneous fees.

The students were accompanied by police authorities in going back to school.

=== Daniel Padilla PBA D-League issue ===
Local celebrity and AMA endorser Daniel Padilla was selected as the final round draft pick of the expansion AMA Online Education Titans of the PBA D-League in 2014. Despite claims that Padilla was enrolled by the university, he ultimately declined to join the D-League and that he was drafted without his prior knowledge.

== Notable alumni ==
- Mujiv Hataman – governor of Basilan and Autonomous Region in Muslim Mindanao
- Chito Jaime – PBA player - San Miguel Beermen
- Getulio Napeñas – former head of the Philippine National Police Special Action Force
- Rainier Castillo – actor, Starstruck
- Teddy Corpuz – vocalist
- Onel de Guzman – computer programmer and hacker
- Jolina Magdangal – actress, singer
- Jon Lucas – actor, dancer, model, singer
- Ryza Cenon – actress, dancer, model
- Sharlene San Pedro – actress, model, video streamer
- Paulo Salud – boxing analyst and content creator
