= AMA School of Medicine =

Private medical college in Makati, Philippines

- Established: 2008
- Founder: Dr. Amable R. Aguiluz V
- Location: Makati, Philippines; 14°32′51″N 121°00′45″E
- Website: www.amaschoolofmedicine.ph
- Location in Metro Manila Location in Luzon Location in the Philippines

AMA School of Medicine, located in Makati, Philippines, was founded by Dr. Amable R. Aguiluz V in 2008. Currently the school has three campuses. AMA School of Medicine applies problem-based teaching methodology, and hands on work such as dissection of cadavers, which increases the students familiarity of the human body. Currently the school offers Doctor of Medicine. Bachelor of Science in Psychology and Bachelor of Science in Nursing are offered as pre-med course. ASM accepts students from any part of the globe. Currently, majority of its students are from the Philippines, India, South Korea, Middle East and some countries in Southeast Asia.

== About AMA School of Medicine ==
A member of the AMA Education System (AMAES) which was founded by Dr. Amable R. Aguiluz V in 2008. Its main campus is located at Osmeña Highway cor. Gen. Mojica Street Makati City, Philippines. With its affiliation to AMA Education System, known for IT-related courses, carries the advantage of offering IT-based education, hence integrating the use of different computer applications and technology to its curriculum.

== Teaching and Learning Methodology ==
AMA School of Medicine (ASM) applies problem-based teaching methodology, a learning method that aims to enhance the students' understanding of how parts and systems of the human body work and affect the patient's health condition. ASM also allows students to perform hands-on anatomy dissection of cadavers, which increases their knowledge and familiarity of the actual human body.

== Branches and Expansion ==
Currently, ASM has 3 campuses in the Philippines including the main campus in Makati. In Northern Luzon, ASM Baguio was opened and ASM Cavite has been established in Southern Luzon. Also coming soon will be the campus in Mindanao located in Davao City.

== Courses Offered ==
Apart from Doctor of Medicine, ASM also offers BS Nursing and BS Psychology as a Pre-med course.

Courses are also offered online as their E-learning program.

== Doctor of Medicine Program ==
The medical curriculum employs various teaching-learning and assessment strategies to achieve the educational goals. As early as the First Year, the students are exposed to cases that would allow them to relate basic science concepts to clinical practice. The first year of the curriculum is designed as modules or blocks based on organ systems with similar or related functions. This instructional plan aims to synchronize topics in Anatomy, Biochemistry and Physiology. Correlation of selected concepts will be achieved through case discussion in a problem-based tutorial session, team learning and case method activities.

The Second and Third Years of the curriculum are a continuum of organ-based modules that integrate basic and clinical concepts. Problem-based learning (PBL) is a principal teaching-learning activity augmented by correlate activities as lecturers, laboratory exercises and case method discussion. The students in a PBL small group setting (ratio of 1 tutor to at most 10 students) encounter and discuss problems common to practice.

The Fourth Year, which is the final year, allows the students to learn from clinical materials in affiliate hospitals and community settings.

Evaluation of student performance is based on the curriculum design where small group learning is a predominant activity. Assessment includes written examinations, practical examinations, clinical observations, and tutorial or case discussion participation and attitude development.

== Partners and Affiliations ==
ASM has partnered with Quirino Memorial Medical Center (QMMC) and Pasig City General Hospital for its clinical clerkship program. At QMMC and PCGH, students of ASM get to encounter different cases at the said medical institution.

== Admissions ==
ASM accepts students from any part of the globe. Currently, majority of its students are from the Philippines, India, South Korea, Middle East and countries in Asian neighbors. Its campus in Cavite has a housing facility for foreign students or for those who need a place to stay in the area while studying at ASM

== Notable alumni ==
- Arlene Cris Damot, Mrs. Universe Philippines
