= Arlene Cris Damot =

Filipino beauty pageant titleholder

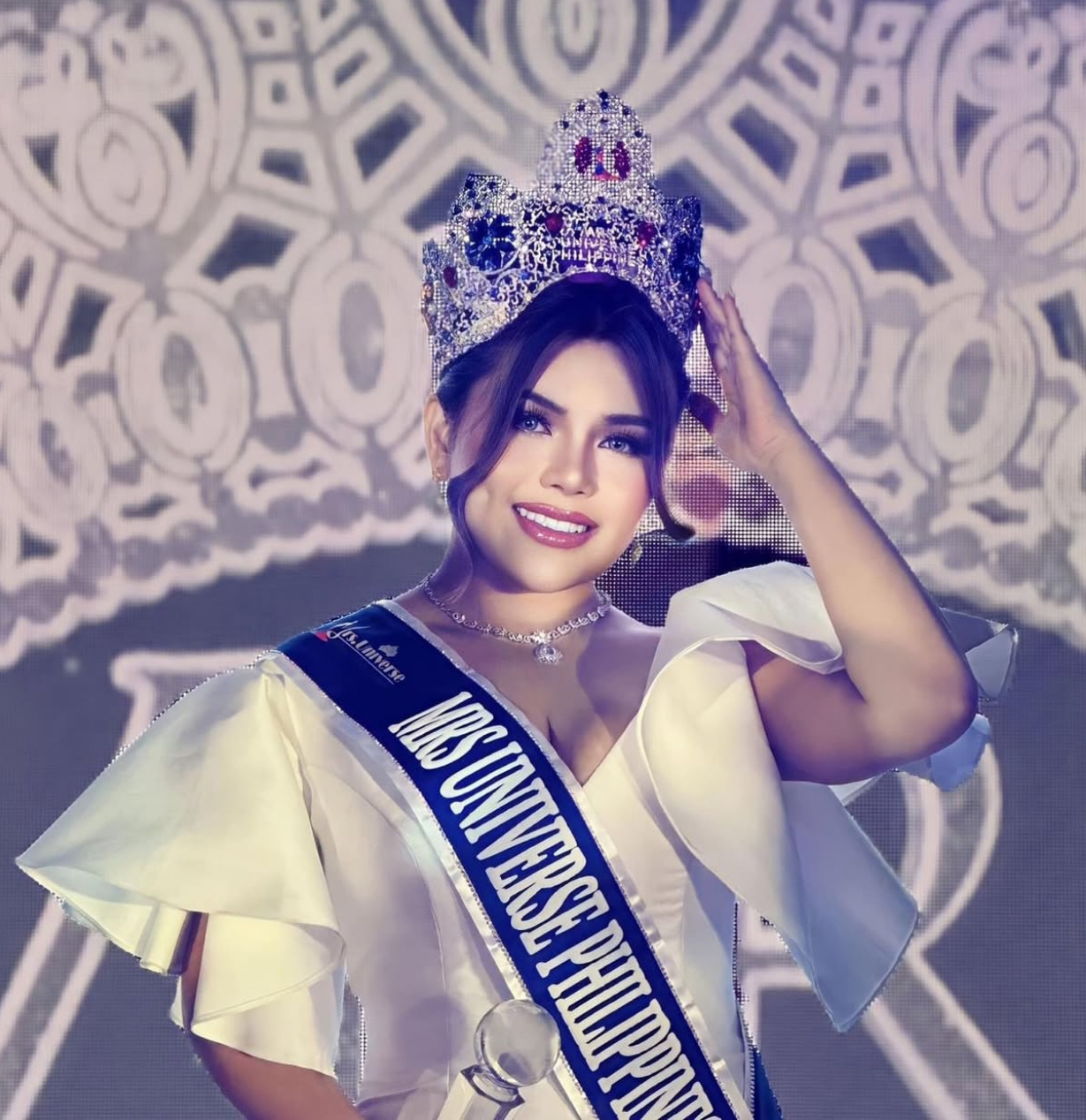
- Damot in 2024
- Born: May 9, 1988 (age 38); Parañaque, Manila Philippines
- Education: AMA School of Medicine (Doctor of Medicine)
- Occupations: Model; entrepreneur; beauty queen
- Spouse: David Jayabalan (m. 2013)
- Children: 2
- Beauty pageant titleholder
- Title: Mrs. Universe Philippines
- Hair colour: Brown
- Eye colour: Black
- Major competitions: Mrs. Universe 2023; (2nd Runner-Up)

Arlene Cris Damot is a Filipino entrepreneur and beauty pageant titleholder who was crowned Mrs. Universe Philippines. An advocate of women's rights, she represented her country in the 2023 Mrs. Universe pageant, where she finished as the second runner-up.

She is the founder and CEO of the medical aesthetic brand, Royal Aesthetics in the Philippines and Malaysia.

== Early life and education ==
Arlene Cris Damot was born and raised in Parañaque, Manila, Philippines. She obtained a certificate in Advanced Aesthetics from the European International University in Paris and a certificate in medical aesthetics from the International Academy of Aesthetics Science.

She worked as a registered nurse in general surgery, otolaryngology, and dermatology in Malaysia before establishing her own business. Additionally, she attended AMA School of Medicine to pursue a Doctor of Medicine degree.

== Entrepreneurship ==
On 25 February 2018, Damot opened the first branch of her Royal Aesthetics Clinic, as CEO and founder. She expanded the business during the COVID-19 pandemic. As of October 2023, the clinic operates six branches, employing more than 95 percent female staff.

== Pageantry ==
On 18 June 2023, she was crowned Mrs. Philippines and later represented her country at the 46th Mrs. Universe pageant held on 8 October 2023 at the Newport Performing Arts Theater in Pasay, where she finished as the second runner-up, the highest placement for a Filipina in the competition's history.

== Advocacy ==
Damot is an advocate for women's rights and inclusivity within the beauty pageant industry.

As the reigning Mrs. Universe Philippines, she supported the Miss Universe Organisation's decision to allow mothers and married women to participate in the competition, emphasising that women should not be confined by age, size, or height.

Whatever age, or whatever size, or whatever height you may have does not define you.

— Arlene Cris Damot

In addition to her advocacy in pageantry, she is the founder and CEO of Royal Aesthetics, a medical aesthetic brand, which also employs a predominantly female workforce, showing her commitment to empowering women in various spheres of life.

== Personal life ==
Damot married Indian businessman David Jayabalan in 2013 in Kuala Lumpur, Malaysia and later relocated to the Philippines in 2018, where they operate aesthetic clinics together. The couple has two sons.
