= Nicole Magadia =

Filipino model

- Born: Reissha Nicole Villar Magadia; July 17, 1998 (age 28); Antipolo, Rizal, Philippines
- Education: Ateneo de Manila University
- Occupations: Beauty Queen, Model, Student
- Height: 5 ft 9 in (175 cm)
- Beauty pageant titleholder
- Title: Miss Teen Philippines 2014
- Years active: 2014–present
- Hair color: Black
- Eye color: Black
- Major competitions: Miss Teen Philippines 2014; Miss Teen International 2016

Reissha Nicole Villar Magadia (born July 17, 1998) is a Filipino print-commercial model and beauty pageant title holder who was crowned Miss Teen Philippines 2014 on May 31, 2014, and represented her country in Miss Teen International 2016 held in Jacksonville, Florida, United States, where she finished first runner-up.

== Early life and education ==
Reissha Nicole Villar was born in Antipolo, Rizal. She graduated valedictorian in elementary and high school. She also represented her school in various competitions, including the 11th National Science Quest hosted by the Department of Education in Baguio City, where she emerged champion in extemporaneous speaking.

She graduated from Ateneo de Manila University with a degree in legal management, with a minor in international business and is currently pursuing a Juris Doctor degree at Ateneo Law School.

== Family ==
Nicole Villar is from a family of lawyers and businessmen. She is the niece of former Senate president and business tycoon Manuel "Manny" Villar. She is also the grand daughter of the late Hon. Judge Arturo Villar.

== Career ==
Magadia becgan as a model, beauty queen and entrepreneur. She is also the founding president of YETE Foundation, Inc. an organization dedicated on volunteerism, education and youth empowerment. At age 14, she was part of Palmolive Circle of Ten where she did a TV commercial with Janella Salvador. She is also a part of Creamsilk-Candy's 30 Beyond Beautiful Ambassadors and Candy Fair 2014. She was also featured in Philippine Daily Inquirer as an endorser for Happy Skin Cosmetics with an article written by Miss Universe 2015 Pia Alonzo Wurtzbach.

Villar is a Philippine delegate to the National Youth Commission's South East Asian Youth Programme (SEAYP) .

She appeared in TV shows like Good Morning Club, a morning show in TV5 for an interview and featured in PTV4's Lakbayin Ang Magandang Pilipinas as a recipient of Sangguniang Bayan Award of Angono, Rizal. She also graced the podcast of The Jing Monis Show as a guest and title holder. As a proud Rizaleño, she promoted woman empowerment during her reign. In an article from Manila Bulletin by Mayor Jun Ynares, she was described to have "the aura of the Rizal province. Young. Beautiful. Determined."

== Pageantry ==
=== Miss Teen Philippines 2014 ===
Villar, aged 15, was crowned 2014 Miss Teen Philippines held at the Philippine International Convention Center in Pasay. She was recognized by her clever response to the question: “What’s the best advice you’ve learned from your mother?”. She received P2.6 million worth of prizes, including a college scholarship package and Sun Cellular products.“The best advice I’ve learned from my mom is woman empowerment,” Magadia said, before she was proclaimed the first Miss Teen Philippines in seven years. She was also the recipient of the Sun Cellular People’s Choice Award after getting the most number of text votes in the competition. With her victory, Magadia becomes the Department of Education youth ambassador tasked to promote the value of education among the youth nationwide. Magadia also represented the Philippines in several global youth conferences, including the Southeast Asian Youth Program and the National Youth Parliament. As a role model for the youth, Magadia said: “I plan to inspire the youth by embodying those values in all my actions, my deeds, and my thoughts and I guess the best way to inspire them is being the change they want to see."

=== Miss Teen International 2016 ===
Villar represented the Philippines in Miss Teen International held on July 30, 2016, in The Times-Union Center for the Performing Arts, Jacksonville, Florida, United States. She competed with teenaged girls from America and other regions in the world. She finished first runner-up amongst 40 candidates.
