= Marilen Espino =

Marilen Espino won Binibining Pilipinas World in 1992. At 6'0, she holds the record as the tallest Filipina candidate to ever represent the country in an international competition to date. Marilen's first taste of the limelight came in 1988 when she won the right to represent the Philippines in the Supermodel of the World competition. She modeled for top fashion designers and was noticed, and eventually wooed to join Binibining Pilipinas. She was an instant favorite in from the press presentation to the finals. A few days before her departure for the Miss World competition, she fell sick and was replaced by Marina Pura Benipayo.
