= Coconut Festival =

Festival in San Pablo, Philippines

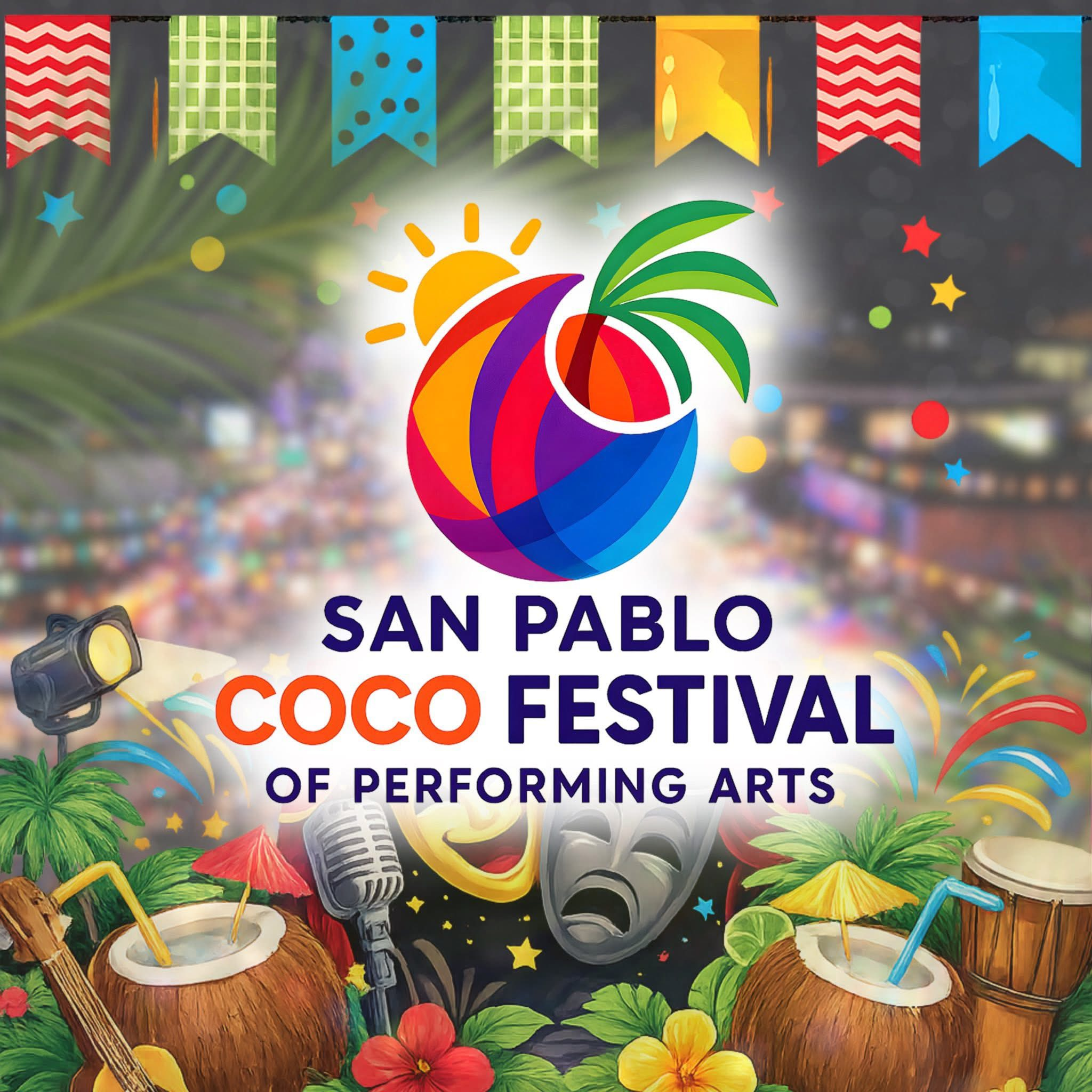
Official poster for the 31st Coco Festival edition in 2026

The Coconut Festival is an annual week-long cultural celebration in San Pablo, Laguna, Philippines. The festival is traditionally celebrated in connection with the feast of Saint Paul the First Hermit on January 15 beginning in 1995, combining religious observances with street performances, parades, pageantry, and community-centered activities that highlight San Pablo City's cultural identity and historical ties to coconut agriculture.

San Pablo City's Coconut Festival also known as Coco Fest gives more colors to the city fiesta which is held every 15 January. It attracts people nearby towns and foreigners as well as local and national media. This boosts the culture and traditions of San Pablenos. The festival also earned citation from the Association of tourism Officers of the Philippines (ATOP) and the Department of Tourism (DOT) as the best tourism Event for Festival Category City Level for Calendar Year 2010-2011-2012-2013 (PIA) which placed San Pablo City, a tourist destination.

The city's "Coconut Festival" garnered 2013's "Pearl Award" as Hall of Famer during the 14th National Convention of the Department of Tourism (DOT)–Association of Tourism Officers of the Philippines (ATOP) held in Legazpi City, Albay.

Beginning with the 2026 edition, the festival underwent a schedule transition. While activities were held both in January 2026 and on May 7, 2026—the latter coinciding with the city's Cityhood Foundation Anniversary—local authorities announced that subsequent editions of the Coconut Festival would be held annually every May 7. This change was intended to preserve January 15 as a distinct religious observance dedicated solely to Saint Paul the First Hermit, while aligning the main cultural festival with the cityhood celebration.

== Background ==
The Coconut Festival traces its origins to community and private-sector initiatives that sought to promote San Pablo City's local culture, tourism, and coconut-based heritage. Over the years, the festival evolved into one of the city's major annual events, drawing participation from barangays, schools, civic organizations, and local businesses. Traditional festival components include street dancing competitions, float parades, and beauty pageants, alongside religious processions connected to the feast of Saint Paul the First Hermit.

== Coco Festival 2026 Edition ==
The 2026 Coconut Festival marked a renewed phase in the festival's development and was organized in two major parts within the same year. The first part was held in January 2026, aligned with the traditional celebrations surrounding the feast of Saint Paul the First Hermit on January 15. The second part took place on May 7, 2026, in conjunction with San Pablo City's Cityhood Foundation Anniversary.

City officials announced that beginning after 2026, the Coconut Festival would be regularly celebrated every May 7, allowing the January 15 feast day of Saint Paul the First Hermit to retain its distinct religious character and observance. This adjustment was intended to clearly distinguish the city's major cultural festival from its primary religious celebration, while strengthening the festival's alignment with the cityhood anniversary.

For the 2026 edition, Rakrakan sa Regidor replaced the traditional Beer Plaza. Located along Regidor Street, this program functioned as a live music and performance zone for local bands and artists, including beer-related activities, providing a community-oriented alternative entertainment space. Family-oriented shows and general festival performances, meanwhile, were staged at the City Plaza Main Stage.

The 2026 edition reflected the city's effort to refresh the Coconut Festival while preserving its established identity. By retaining hallmark activities and adapting others, the festival continued to serve as a platform for cultural expression, tourism promotion, and community engagement in San Pablo City.

== Traditional Programs ==
Throughout its history, the Coconut Festival has featured several recurring activities that define the celebration:

- Coco Float Parade – A parade of decorated floats presented by local institutions and groups, emphasizing creativity, civic pride, and festival symbolism. It was first held in 1996. It is also a competition open to local and private sectors including schools and organizations. During the 90s, Coconut Festival float parade was held a day before the street dancing competition. It was a separate event but owing to the growing number of events and programs during the long-week festival, organizers joined the float parade and the street dancing competition into one big spectacular day usually held on 13 January.

Float Winners
Date	1st	2nd	3rd
2016	SM City - San Pablo	Scuola dei Bambini di Sta. Teresita	Academia de San Ignacio de Loyola
2015	SM City - San Pablo	South Lakes Integrated School	
2014	SM City - San Pablo	Holy Dream Kiddie Learning Center	Academia de San Ignacio de Loyola
2013	Scuola dei Bambini di Sta. Teresita	SM City - San Pablo	Laguna State Polytechnic University
2012	SM City - San Pablo	Scuola dei Bambini di Sta. Teresita	Ramirez Kiddie Learning Center
2011	Scuola dei Bambini di Sta. Teresita		

- Coco Carnival Queen – A festival competition showcasing candidates in coconut-inspired attire and cultural presentations, serving as a platform for local representation and tourism promotion.
- Coco Art Festival – A diverse range of human activities in creating visual, auditory or performing artifacts (artworks), expressing the author's imaginative or technical skill, intended to be appreciated for their beauty or emotional power.
- Lakan at Mutya ng San Pablo – A traditional pageant recognizing male and female representatives who embody local culture, values, and community pride.
- The Voice San Pablo / San Pablo Idol – A singing competition highlighting local vocal talent, commonly staged as a major audience event during the festival period.
- Hataw SanPy – A dance competition featuring energetic group performances that emphasize creativity, rhythm, and contemporary interpretations of festival themes.
- Beer Plaza – In previous editions, a designated entertainment and social area featuring live music and community gatherings.
- Rakrakan sa Regidor – For the 2026 edition, Rakrakan sa Regidor replaced the traditional Beer Plaza. Located along Regidor Street in front of the City Shopping Mall, this program functions as a live music and performance zone for local bands and artists, including beer-related activities, providing a community-oriented alternative entertainment space.
- Street Dancing / Mardi Gras – A major highlight of the festival, featuring choreographed performances by competing groups among schools within San Pablo City and special performances by different groups and organizations. Performers wear colorful costumes inspired by coconuts, local culture, and religious themes. The competition is divided in three divisions: Elementary, Secondary and the College Divisions. Costumes and props of performers are made from coconut trees. Current music used is the "Mabuhay ang San Pablo" (Long live the city) song and its remixed versions.

== Street Dancing Winners ==
Street Dancing Results
2025	1st	2nd	3rd	4th
Elementary Level	San Francisco District	Dapdapan District	Lakeside District	Fule Almeda District
Secondary Level	San Pablo City Integrated High School	Crecencia Drusila Lopez Senior High School	Del Remedio National High School	Col. Lauro Dizon Memorial Integrated High School
College Level				
2024	1st	2nd	3rd	
Elementary Level	Fule Almeda District	Dapdapan District	Lakeside District	
Secondary Level	San Pablo City Integrated High School	Col. Lauro Dizon Memorial Integrated High School	San Jose Integrated High School	
College Level				
2020	1st	2nd	3rd	
Elementary Level	Lakeside District	Santo Angel District	Del Remedio District	
Secondary Level	San Pablo City Integrated High School	Prudencia D. Fule Memorial National High School	Santisimo Rosario National High School	
College Level	Laguna State Polytechnic University	Dalubhasaan ng Lungsod ng San Pablo		
2017	1st	2nd	3rd	
Elementary Level	Dapdapan District	Lakeside District	Santo Angel District	
Secondary Level	Santisimo Rosario National High School	San Isidro National High School	San Jose National High School	
College Level	Dalubhasaan ng Lunsod ng San Pablo			
2016	1st	2nd	3rd	
Elementary Level	Lakeside District	Sto. Angel District	Del Remedio District	
Secondary Level	San Bartolome National High School	San Vicente National High School	Prudencia Fule Memorial National High School	
College Level	Laguna State Polytechnic University	Dalubhasaan ng Lunsod ng San Pablo	Laguna College	
2015	1st	2nd	3rd	
Elementary Level	Lakeside District	Dapdapan District	Del Remedio District	
Secondary Level	Santisimo Rosario National High School	Col. Lauro D. Dizon Memorial National High School	San Jose National High School	
College Level	Dalubhasaan ng Lunsod ng San Pablo			
2014	1st	2nd	3rd	
Elementary Level	Lakeside District	Dapdapan District	Canossa College	
Secondary Level	San Vicente National High School ^{3}	San Pablo City National High School	Prudencia Fule Memorial National High School	
College Level	Dalubhasaan ng Lunsod ng San Pablo	Laguna State Polytechnic University	San Pablo Colleges	
2013 ^{2}	1st	2nd	3rd	
Elementary Level	Lakeside District	Sto. Angel District	Ambray District	
Secondary Level	Col. Lauro D. Dizon Memorial National High School	Del Remedio National High School	Santisimo Rosario National High School	
College Level	Dalubhasaan ng Lunsod ng San Pablo	Not Applicable	Not Applicable	
2012	1st	2nd	3rd	
Elementary Level	Dapdapan District	San Francisco District	Fule Almeda District	
Secondary Level	San Pablo City National High School	San Bartolome National High School	San Jose National High School	
College Level	Dalubhasaan ng Lunsod ng San Pablo	San Pablo Colleges	Laguna State Polytechnic University	
2011	1st	2nd	3rd	
Elementary Level	Lakeside District	Dapdapan District	San Francisco District	
Secondary Level	Laguna College ^{1}	Col. Lauro D. Dizon Memorial National High School	St. Joseph School	
College Level	Laguna State Polytechnic University	San Pablo Colleges	Dalubhasaan ng Lunsod ng San Pablo	
2010	1st	2nd	3rd	
Elementary Level	Lakeside District	Canossa College	Sto. Angel District	
Secondary Level	San Pablo City National High School	St. Joseph School	Canossa College	
College Level	Laguna State Polytechnic University	San Pablo Colleges	Dalubhasaan ng Lunsod ng San Pablo	
2009	1st	2nd	3rd	
Elementary Level	Liceo De San Pablo	Lakeside District	San Francisco District	
Secondary Level	Col. Lauro D. Dizon Memorial National High School	Liceo De San Pablo		
2008	1st	2nd	3rd	
College Level	San Pablo Colleges	Laguna State Polytechnic University	Canossa College	
2007	1st	2nd	3rd	
College Level	Canossa College	Laguna State Polytechnic University		
Secondary Level	San Isidro National High School	Col. Lauro D. Dizon Memorial National High School		
Elementary Level	Ambray District			
2006	1st	2nd	3rd	
College Level	Canossa College	Laguna State Polytechnic University		
2001	1st	2nd	3rd	
Secondary Level	Canossa College	Liceo De San Pablo		
2000	1st	2nd	3rd	
Secondary Level	Laguna College	Canossa College	San Pablo Colleges	
1999	1st	2nd	3rd	
Elementary Level	Lakeside District			
1998	1st	2nd	3rd	
Elementary Level	Lakeside District			
Secondary Level	Canossa College	Laguna College	Col. Lauro D. Dizon Memorial National High School	
1997	1st	2nd	3rd	
Elementary Level	Lakeside District	Ambray District		
Secondary Level	CC Technical Institute	Canossa College	Col. Lauro D. Dizon Memorial National High School	
1996	1st	2nd	3rd	
Elementary Level	St. Joseph School			
Secondary Level	Canossa College		Laguna College	
College Level	SPC National School of Arts and Trades	Laguna College		

- In 2024, there is no College/University Division.

^{1} - Representative to the 1st La Laguna Festival Street Dancing Competition. Laguna is the province where San Pablo City belongs.
^{2} - Only one delegation participated in the college/University Division
^{3} - Invited to perform at the SMX Travel Tour Expo to be held on 14 to 16 February 2014.

== Street Dancing Special Awards ==
Awards
2025	Best in Costume	Best Choreography	Liveliest Group
Elementary Level	Lakeside District	San Francisco District	Lakeside District
Secondary Level	Del Remedio National High School	San Pablo City Integrated High School	Crecencia Drusila Lopez Senior High School
College Level			
2024	Best in Costume	Best Choreography	Liveliest Group
Elementary Level	Lakeside District	Fule Almeda District	Lakeside District
Secondary Level	Felix Amante Senior High School	San Pablo City Integrated High School	San Pablo City Integrated High School
College Level			
2020	Best in Costume	Best Choreography	Liveliest Group
Elementary Level	Lakeside District	Lakeside District	Lakeside District
Secondary Level	San Pablo City Integrated High School	San Pablo City Integrated High School	San Pablo City Integrated High School
College Level	Dalubhasaan ng Lunsod ng San Pablo	Laguna State Polytechnic University	Laguna State Polytechnic University
2017	Best in Costume	Best Choreography	Liveliest Group
Elementary Level	Lakeside District	Dapdapan District	Santo Angel District
Secondary Level	Santisimo Rosario National High School	Santisimo Rosario National High School	Santisimo Rosario National High School
College Level	Dalubhasaan ng Lunsod ng San Pablo	Dalubhasaan ng Lunsod ng San Pablo	Dalubhasaan ng Lunsod ng San Pablo
2016	Best in Costume	Best Choreography	Liveliest Group
Elementary Level	Lakeside District	Del Remedio District	Del Remedio District
Secondary Level	Prudencia Fule Memorial National High School	San Bartolome National High School	San Bartolome National High School
College Level	Laguna College	Dalubhasan ng Lungsod ng San Pablo	Dalubhasan ng Lungsod ng San Pablo
2015	Best in Costume	Best Choreography	Liveliest Group
Elementary Level	Lakeside District	Dapdapan District	Dapdapan District
Secondary Level	Col. Lauro E. Dizon National High School	Santisimo Rosario National High School	Santisimo Rosario National High School
College Level	Dalubhasan ng Lungsod ng San Pablo	Dalubhasan ng Lungsod ng San Pablo	Dalubhasan ng Lungsod ng San Pablo
2014	Best in Costume	Best Choreography	
Elementary Level	Canossa College	Dapdapan District	
Secondary Level	San Vicente National High School	San Pablo City National High School	
College Level	Dalubhasan ng Lungsod ng San Pablo	Dalubhasan ng Lungsod ng San Pablo	
2013	Best in Costume	Best Choreography	
Elementary Level	Lakeside District	Sto. Angel District	
Secondary Level	Col. Lauro E. Dizon National High School	Del Remedio National High School	
College Level	Not Awarded	Not Awarded	
2012	Best in Costume	Best Choreography	
Elementary Level	Dapdapan District	Dapdapan District	
Secondary Level	Laguna College	San Pablo City National High School	
College Level	Laguna State Polytechnic University	Dalubhasaan ng Lunsod ng San Pablo	
2011	Best in Costume	Best Choreography	
Elementary Level	Lakeside District	Lakeside District	
Secondary Level	Laguna College	Laguna College	
College Level	Laguna State Polytechnic University	Laguna State Polytechnic University	
2010	Best in Costume	Best Choreography	
Elementary Level	Lakeside District	Lakeside District	
Secondary Level	San Pablo City National High School	San Pablo City National High School	
College Level	San Pablo Colleges	Laguna State Polytechnic University	

- In 2013 and 2017, only one delegate participated in the college/University Division. - In 2024, there is no College/University Division.

== Cultural Importance ==
The Coconut Festival remains a significant cultural event in San Pablo City, symbolizing the city's religious devotion, communal creativity, and local heritage. Through its evolving programs, the festival continues to play a role in strengthening civic pride and sustaining cultural traditions across generations.
