= Miss Philippines Earth 2021 =

21st Miss Philippines Earth pageant

- Date: August 8, 2021
- Presenters: Robi Domingo
- Theme: Colors of the Earth
- Venue: Carousel Productions Headquarters, Manila, Philippines and various locations virtually
- Broadcaster: ABS-CBN
- Entrants: 66 (Note: Only 66 Delegates attended from the Finals. Miss El Salvador, and Miss San Fernando (Pampanga) withdraws from the Final Competition)
- Placements: 20
- Withdrawals: El Salvador; San Fernando, Pampanga
- Winner: Naelah Alshorbaji; Parañaque

Miss Philippines Earth 2021 was the 21st edition of the Miss Philippines Earth pageant, held virtually for a second year due to the COVID-19 pandemic, on August 8, 2021.

Roxanne Allison Baeyens of Baguio crowned Naelah Alshorbaji of Parañaque as her successor at the end of the event. Also crowned were the court of elemental queens: Ameera Almamari, Miss Philippines Air, Rocel Songano, Miss Philippines Water, Roni Meneses, Miss Philippines Fire, and Sofia Lopez Galve, Miss Philippines Eco Tourism 2021.

== Results ==
=== Placements ===
Placement	Contestant
Miss Philippines Earth 2021	Parañaque – Naelah Alshorbaji
Miss Philippines Air 2021	Atimonan – Ameera Almamari
Miss Philippines Water 2021	Iloilo City – Rocel Angelah Songano
Miss Philippines Fire 2021	Mandaluyong – Roni Meneses §
Miss Philippines Eco Tourism 2021	Tanay – Sofia Lopez Galve
Runners-Up	Malungon – Fatima Kate Bisan; Santo Domingo – Aubrey Asuncion; Silay – Riah De Ocampo; Siniloan – Yllana Aduana; Sugbongcogon – Katheryn Tan Guipetacio
Top 20	Angeles – Gail Ventic; Baler – Verna Abby Catusalem; Carrascal – Louise Theunis; Cordon – Zeneth Khan; Cotabato City – Alexandra Salazar; Esperanza – Amira Alisha Qamhawe; Moalboal – Charissa Rama; Nagtipunan – Xyra Ballesteros; Talisay – Mia Jane Salisbury; Tungawan – Myrizza Borja

§ – Voted into Top 20 by viewers

=== Special awards ===
Competition	Winners
Best in Eco Video	Cordon, Isabela – Zeneth Khan; Esperanza, Sultan Kudarat – Amira Alisha Qamhawe; Iloilo City – Rocel Angelah Songano

Competition	Gold	Silver	Bronze
Beach Wear	Olongapo – Anita Rose Gomez	Silay – Riah De Ocampo	Nagtipunan – Xyra Ballesteros
Casual Wear	Iloilo City – Rocel Angelah Songano	Moalboal – Charissa Rama	Catanauan – Vivien Fabella
Cultural Attire	Malungon – Fatima Kate Bisan	Sugbongcogon – Katheryn Guipetacio	Baler, Aurora – Verna Abby Catusalem
Long Gown	Atimonan – Ameera Almamari	Parañaque – Naelah Alshorbaji	Angeles City – Gail Ventic
Sports Wear	El Nido, Palawan – Daena Yapparcon	Lapu-Lapu City – Claire Codilla	Victoria, Tarlac – Frincess Dannug

Competition	Category	Gold	Silver	Bronze
Talent Competition	Dancing Category	Silay – Riah De Ocampo	San Marcelino – Mavi Cabling	Malungon – Fatima Bisan
Talent Competition	Creative Category	Iloilo City – Rocel Angelah Songano	Sugbongcogon – Katheryn Guipetacio	Atimonan – Ameera Almamari
Talent Competition	Singing Category	Santo Domingo, Albay – Aubrey Asuncion	Baler, Aurora – Verna Abby Catusalem	Quezon City – Angelica Tagadtad

== Contestants ==
66 contestants representing various cities, municipalities, provinces, and communities abroad competed for the title.

Locality	Contestant	Age (Note: Ages at the time of the Pageant)
Alaminos	Le-Ann Casandra Racuya	20
Anda	Irish Delima	20
Angeles	Gail Ventic	25
Atimonan	Ameera Almamari	19
Aurora	Myra Yzabelle Rola	21
Baclayon	Jessyville Ugat	21
Balayan	Elize Galvez	23
Baler	Verna Abby Catusalem	24
Bayambang	Jan Rlee De Guzman	19
Bugallon	Chynna Kaye Verosil	18
Calamba	Ma. Trisha Medrana	19
Caloocan	Jerimi Nuqui	19
Carrascal	Louise Theunis	22
Catanauan	Vivien Fabella	24
Cebu City	Guia Moreno	24
Claver	Jan Junibell Lura	23
Cordon	Zeneth Khan	23
Cotabato City	Alexandra Salazar	28
Davao City	Elda Louise Aznar	26
Digos	Irish Ebuen	27
Dumaguete	Krizia Hamsirani	26
El Nido	Daena Yapparcon	19
Esperenza	Amira Alisha Qamhawe	21
General Santos	Sunshine Mae Ningasca	21
Iloilo City	Rocel Angelah Songano	18
Jagna	Mary Gwynn Curambis	19
Lapu-Lapu	Claire Codilla	26
Las Piñas	Hannah Quinalayo	20
Mabini (Batangas)	Samantha Elin Coloso	22
Mabini (D.D.O.)	Chenna Gamale Solamillo	21
Mabitac	Jelina Pearl Miranda	24
Makilala	Arra Rago	20
Malolos	Nikka Vhea	20
Malungon	Fatima Kate Bisan	21
Mandaluyong	Roni Meneses	26
Mandaue	Esperanza Mina	25
Manila	Sarah Margarette Joson	28
Maribojoc	Gea Caroline Gabaisen	19
Marilao	Meleah Moreno	21
Moalboal	Charissa Rama	22
Nagtipunan	Xyra Ballesteros	21
Naic	Jezreal De Ocampo	21
Olongapo	Anita Rose Gomez	19
Parañaque	Naelah Alshorbaji	23
Polomolok	Precious Valerie Animas	21
Puerto Princesa	Rocheanne Bonggat	21
Quezon City	Angelica Tagadtad	21
Roxas	Marie Manansala	19
Saguday	Angel Keith Dizon	18
San Fernando	Kheshen Babatid	22
San Juan	Ellyssa May Cedilla	24
San Luis	Judie Ann Castro	23
San Marcelino	Mavi Cabling	20
Silang	Alyanna Villena	23
Silay	Riah De Ocampo	26
Siniloan	Yllana Marie Aduana	22
Santa Cruz	Christine Cadiz	21
Santo Domingo	Aubrey Asuncion	27
Sual	Yna Jalin	25
Sugbongcogon	Katheryn Guipetacio	20
Taguig	Jia Gold Bustamante	22
Talisay	Mia Jane Salisbury	21
Tanay	Sofia Galve	24
Tungawan	Myrizza Borja	23
Urdaneta	Marvie Fernandez	25
Victoria	Frincess Dannug	26

== Judges ==
- Marc Nelson – TV Host, Environmentalist and WWF and World Vision Ambassador
- Nguyễn Phương Khánh – Miss Earth 2018 and Top Influencer & Celebrity in Vietnam
- Kim Atienza – TV Host, Actor, and Weather Anchor in ABS-CBN
- Lindsey Coffey – Miss Earth 2020, WWF Ambassador Climate Reality Leader and Professional Model
- Michael Seifert – International Model and Founder of TalentMan Models in Germany
