= Miss Philippines Earth 2022 =

22nd Miss Philippines Earth pageant

- Date: August 6, 2022
- Presenters: Robi Domingo; Karen Ibasco
- Theme: ME Loves Fauna
- Venue: Tag Resort, Coron, Palawan
- Broadcaster: ZOE TV
- Entrants: 34
- Placements: 20
- Withdrawals: Antipolo; Del Carmen; Ibaan; Jagna; Kauswagan; Midsayap
- Winner: Jenny Ramp; Santa Ignacia

Miss Philippines Earth 2022 was the 22nd edition of the Miss Philippines Earth pageant, held at the Tag Resort in Coron, Palawan, on August 6, 2022.

Naelah Alshorbaji of Parañaque crowned Jenny Ramp of Santa Ignacia as her successor at the end of the event. With her crowned are the court of elemental queens: Jimema Tempra as Miss Philippines Air, Angel Santos as Miss Philippines Water, Erika Tan as Miss Philippines Fire, and Nice Lampad as Miss Philippines Eco Tourism. Ramp represented the Philippines at Miss Earth 2022.

== Results ==
=== Placements ===
Placement	Contestant
Miss Philippines Earth 2022	Santa Ignacia – Jenny Ramp
Miss Philippines Air 2022	Jasaan – Jimema Tempra
Miss Philippines Water 2022	Trece Martires – Angeline Mae Santos
Miss Philippines Fire 2022	Legazpi – Erika Vina Tan
Miss Philippines Eco Tourism 2022	Bayugan – Nice Lampad
Runners-Up	Cebu City – Kiara Liane Wellington; Mandaluyong – Jennifer de Asis; Muntinlupa – Micaela Legarda; Sagay – Jarizz Borcelas; Toronto – Jasmine Paguio
Top 20	Alabel – Merhyl Kit Paraluman; Balagtas – Trisha Van Eldik; Dipolog – Rache Santos; Cadiz – Jayra Aliyah Olivinada; Dubai – Chrisdalyn Abrenica; Makati – Khatrina Martinez; Manila – Justiene Ortega; Pateros – Jazmine Calma; Quezon City – Maria Lourdez de Leon

== Contestants ==
Thirty-four contestants competed for the title.

Locality	Contestant	Age
Alabel	Merhyl Kit Paraluman	20
Angono	Dayzeree Kent Gonzales	24
Balagtas	Trisha Van Eldik	22
Bauang	Vallery Paulite	23
Bayugan	Nice Lampad	21
Cadiz	Jayra Aliyah Olivinada	21
Calatagan	Hannah Shenneil Arellano	19
Cebu City	Kiara Liane Wellington	20
Dipolog	Rache Santos	24
Dubai	Chrisdalyn Yvonne Abrenica	22
Toronto	Jasmine Paguio	23
Jasaan	Jimema Tempra	18
Lambayong	Claudia Lhoffer Reman Ukatu	21
Las Piñas	Bea Cecilio	27
Legazpi	Erika Vina Talavera Tan	27
Makati	Khatrina Martinez	24
Mandaluyong	Jennifer de Asis	25
Manila	Justiene Ortega	28
Matanao	Shenna Enjelle Resaba	24
Mati	Wizza Moreno	26
Muntinlupa	Micaela Legarda	23
Naujan	Kristel David	22
Pagadian	Scottie Alviz	25
Pateros	Jazmine Calma	25
Polomolok	Ionna Servinio	21
Quezon City	Maria Lourdez de Leon	26
Sagay	Jarizz Borcelas	21
Sampaloc	Rizchelle Simbillo	27
San Jose del Monte	Isabella Dawson	22
Santa Ignacia	Jennylynn Sinead Ramp	19
San Vicente	Christine Glory Balboa	27
Silang	Danikka Vyarra Canilang	25
Tampakan	Sunshine Paraico	26
Trece Martires	Angeline Mae Santos	27
