= Yllana Aduana =

Filipina beauty pageant titleholder (born 1998) in the Philippines

Yllana Marie Aduana
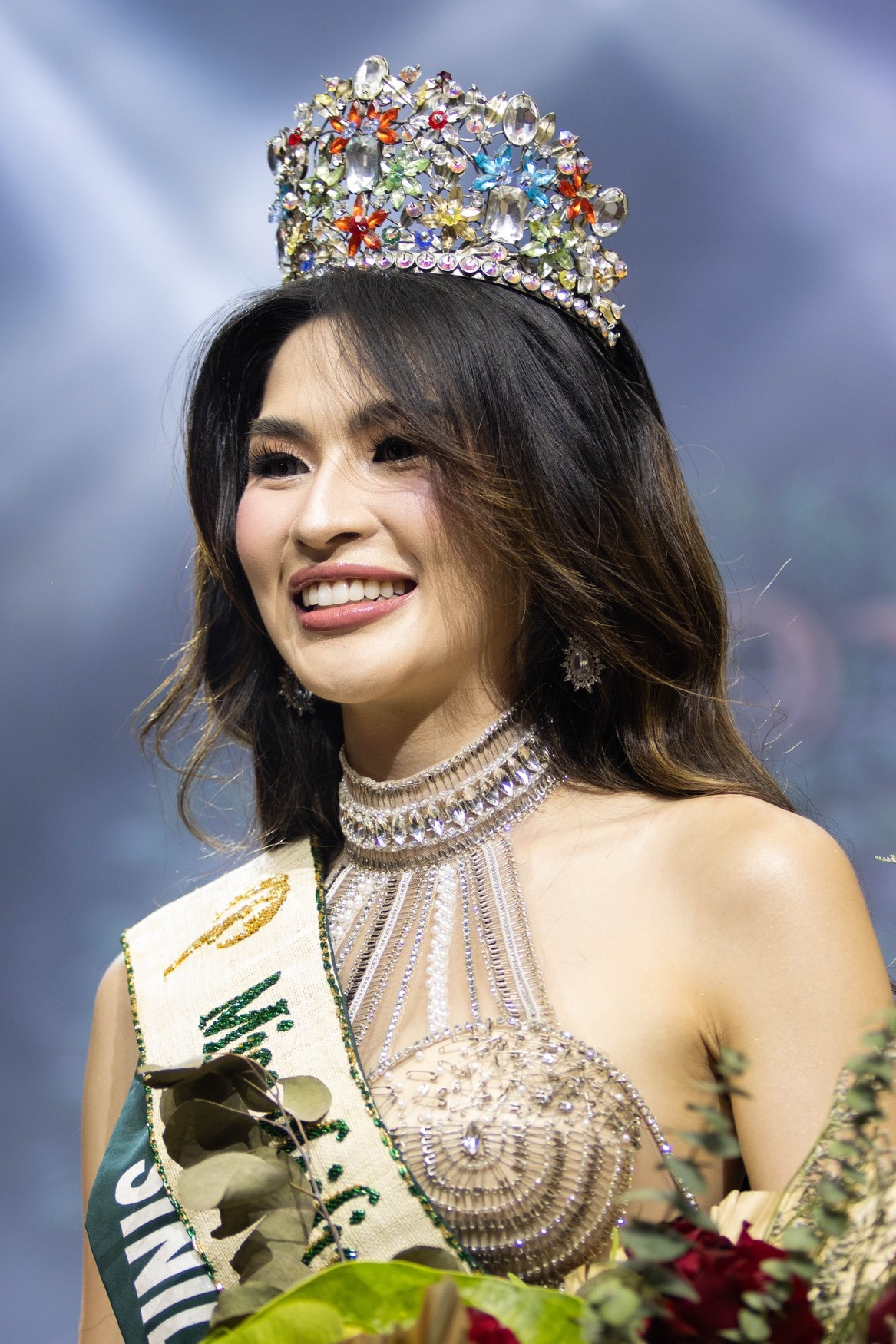
- Aduana in 2023
- Born: Yllana Marie Singin Aduana; July 7, 1998 (age 28); Siniloan, Laguna, Philippines
- Education: Centro Escolar University (BS)
- Height: 1.70 m (5 ft 7 in)
- Beauty pageant titleholder
- Title: Miss Fit Philippines 2021; Miss Philippines Earth 2023; Miss Earth Air 2023
- Major competitions: Miss Philippines Earth 2021; (Runner-Up); Miss Fit Philippines 2021; (Winner); Binibining Pilipinas 2022; (Top 12); Miss Philippines Earth 2023; (Winner); Miss Earth 2023; (Miss Earth – Air); Miss Universe Philippines 2025 (2nd Runner-Up)

Yllana Marie Singin Aduana (Tagalog: [ɪlˈjɑːnə məˈriː əˈdwɑːnə]; born July 7, 1998) is a Filipino a beauty pageant titleholder who was crowned Miss Philippines Earth 2023. An advocate for environmental education, Aduana represented the country in Miss Earth 2023 and won as Miss Earth Air. Aduana competed at Miss Universe Philippines 2025 and finished as the second runner-up.

Aduana previously won Miss FIT Philippines 2021 and competed at the Miss Philippines Earth 2021 and Binibining Pilipinas 2022 pageants. She graduated from Centro Escolar University with a Bachelor of Science in Medical Technology and worked as a flight attendant for Philippine Airlines.

== Early life and education ==
Yllana Marie "Yana" Singin Aduana was born on July 7, 1998, in Siniloan, Laguna. She graduated from Centro Escolar University with a Bachelor of Science in Medical Technology in 2018, later passing the Medical Technologist Licensure Examination in the same year. She started a skincare business in 2018 and worked as a flight attendant for Philippine Airlines until being laid off in 2021, amid the COVID-19 pandemic in the Philippines.

== Pageantry ==
=== Miss Philippines Earth 2021 ===
On May 25, 2021, Aduana was announced to be one of the 68 delegates competing at Miss Philippines Earth 2021. At the virtual pageant held on August 8, 2021, Aduana finished as a runner-up. Naelah Alshorbaji of Parañaque won the pageant.

=== Miss FIT Philippines 2021 and Binibining Pilipinas 2022 ===
Aduana competed and won Miss FIT Philippines 2021, held in September 2021. She was crowned by her predecessor Malka Shaver.

As Miss FIT Philippines, Aduana was announced as one of the 40 candidates competing at Binibining Pilipinas 2022, representing her home province of Laguna. She reached the top 12, and won the Face of Binibini award. At the question-and-answer portion, she was asked "What are your thoughts and sentiments on the advocacy my body, my choice?". She responded:

I believe that all women should always be entitled to our own opinions and we should have the most autonomy on whatever decision that we have towards our bodies because as women, we are a tower of strength, a pillar of hope, and a champion of purpose. We should always believe that all our choices should always come right into our hands.

At the end of her reign as Miss FIT Philippines, she crowned Jackelaine Fleming of Calbayog, as her successor.

=== Miss Philippines Earth 2023 ===
On April 5, 2023, Aduana was announced as one of the 29 delegates competing at Miss Philippines Earth 2023, representing Siniloan. In an interview with the Philippine Entertainment Portal, she stated that she had joined the pageant again to promote her environmental causes.

In pre-pageant events, Aduana won the Darling of the Press award, and was third in the talent competition.

At the pageant, Aduana wore a dress designed by Ken Batino that was decorated by 5,000 safety pins. At the final question and answer round, she was asked "What do you think people in the future would say about your generation?". She replied:

I would definitely say that our generation, although misconstrued as very ardent, …we use our voice for a reason, and that is to always speak up for the things that we know are right, and for the things that we know that we deserve. That is why we are very ardent about it.

At the end of the pageant on 29 April, Aduana was named as the winner and was crowned by outgoing titleholder Jenny Ramp, as Miss Philippines Earth 2023. As Miss Philippines Earth, Aduana participated in various advocacy work. Shortly after winning, Aduana joined a clean-up drive at Sulat, Eastern Samar, on May 13, 2023. On June 30, 2023, Aduana participated in an Arbor Day bootcamp at Quezon City. On July 5, 2023, Aduana spoke at the United Nations climate meet, becoming the first Filipino beauty queen to do so.

On May 11, 2024, Aduana crowned Irha Mel Alfeche as her successor as Miss Earth Philippines.

=== Miss Earth 2023 ===
As Miss Philippines Earth, Aduana represented the Philippines at Miss Earth 2023. In pre-pageant activities, Aduana placed in the top five for Best Appearance and spoke on behalf of the delegates of Asia and Oceania in the Eco Project segment.

During the preliminary rounds, Aduana wore a skin-bearing turquoise gown made of recycled zippers designed by Batino. For the National Costume round, Aduana wore a Partick Isorena ensemble inspired by the mythological figure Maria Makiling. On December 20, Aduana was announced as the winner for the Best in Bikini award.

At the pageant proper, Aduana ultimately advanced to the top four, where the finalists were asked if they agreed with an official at a "recent climate conference" who was quoted as "there is no science behind coals for the phaseout of fossil fuels". She responded:

As someone who is from the medical field, I do believe that everything roots from science. And I think that the greatest gift that we have in this generation is the sophisticated technical installations that we have, and so there is science in the phaseout of fossil fuels. But one thing that we can also agree on is we can always live the zero-waste and sustainable lifestyle. I've always been practicing it because sustainability will always ensure the stability in our future. And if we can master the transferability skills from a just phaseout, then we will have a greener and more sustainable future.

At the end of the pageant, Aduana was crowned as Miss Earth Air 2023, the highest placement of the Philippines since 2017 when Karen ibasco finished as Miss Earth 2017. The title of Miss Earth was won by Drita Ziri of Albania.

=== Miss Universe Philippines 2025 ===
On February 3, 2025, the Laguna branch of the Miss Universe Philippines pageant appointed Aduana to represent Siniloan in the 2025 pageant.

In pre-pageant events held at SM Mall of Asia Arena on April 29, she was awarded five special awards from the event's sponsors. At the evening gown portion of the said event she wore an orange evening gown designed by Leo Almodal. At the national costume showcase and charity event held at Okada Manila on May 1, she wore a national costume inspired by Maria Makiling designed by Ehrran Montoya.

The coronation night took place at SM Mall of Asia Arena on May 2, 2025, where she wore another gown designed by Almodal for the evening gown portion.

Aduana was one of the finalists who proceeded to the question and answer round where she was asked: "If you were to be the governor or the mayor of the local government you are representing now, what would be the single most significant project that you would wish to accomplish and why?". She replied:

I’ve always known myself to be a committed advocate of education. And I would definitely promote education empowerment across all genders in our municipality. Because we all understand that education is the key to open multiple doors of opportunities, the power that no one can ever take away from us, and the solution to feel more empowered and transformed.

At the end of the event, Aduana finished her journey as the second runner-up, where Ahtisa Manalo of Quezon won the crown.

== Advocacies and platforms ==
Aduana and her sister founded Edukasyon for Every Juan, a nonprofit organization that aims to promote environmental education.

Aduana has expressed her support for the Menstrual Leave Act, which aims to give women two-day menstrual leave. She added that the proposal would encourage economic growth.

== Personal life ==
In an interview with Inquirer, Aduana revealed that she suffered from bulimia nervosa, and credits her participation in Miss FIT Philippines in helping her recover from the disorder.

Awards and achievements
Preceded by Ahtisa Manalo (Quezon)	Miss Universe Philippines; 2nd Runner-Up; 2025	Not awarded
Preceded by Sheridan Mortlock (Australia)	Miss Earth – Air; 2023	Succeeded by Hrafnhildur Haraldsdóttir (Iceland)
Preceded by Jenny Ramp (Santa Ignacia)	Miss Philippines Earth; 2023	Succeeded by Irha Mel Alfeche (Matanao)
Preceded by Malka Shaver (Dumaguete)	Miss Fit Philippines; 2021	Succeeded by Jackelaine Fleming (Calbayog)
