= Hoya anncajanoae =

Scientific classification
- Kingdom: Plantae
- Clade: Tracheophytes
- Clade: Angiosperms
- Clade: Eudicots
- Clade: Asterids
- Order: Gentianales
- Family: Apocynaceae
- Genus: Hoya
- Species: H. anncajanoae

Binomial name
- Hoya anncajanoae Kloppenb. & Siar

Species of flowering plant

Hoya anncajanoae is a species of flowering plant in the family Apocynaceae, endemic to Luzon in the Philippines. It was described in 2008 by Dale Kloppenburg and S. V. Siar.

== Taxonomy ==
The species was published in Asia Life Sciences in 2008. The type specimen (Siar & Cajano 5923) was collected on 29 November 2006 at Barangay Kapatalan, Siniloan, Laguna, at about 300 metres (980 ft) elevation. The holotype is held at the herbarium of the University of the Philippines Los Baños (CAHUP 70358), with isotypes CAHUP 70359 and 70360.

== Etymology ==
According to Kloppenburg, the species was named for Mary Ann O. Cajano, one of its collectors. Cajano was a herbarium associate at the Museum of Natural History, University of the Philippines Los Baños.

== Distribution ==
Hoya anncajanoae is endemic to Luzon.
