= Miss Philippines Earth 2023 =

23rd Miss Philippines Earth pageant

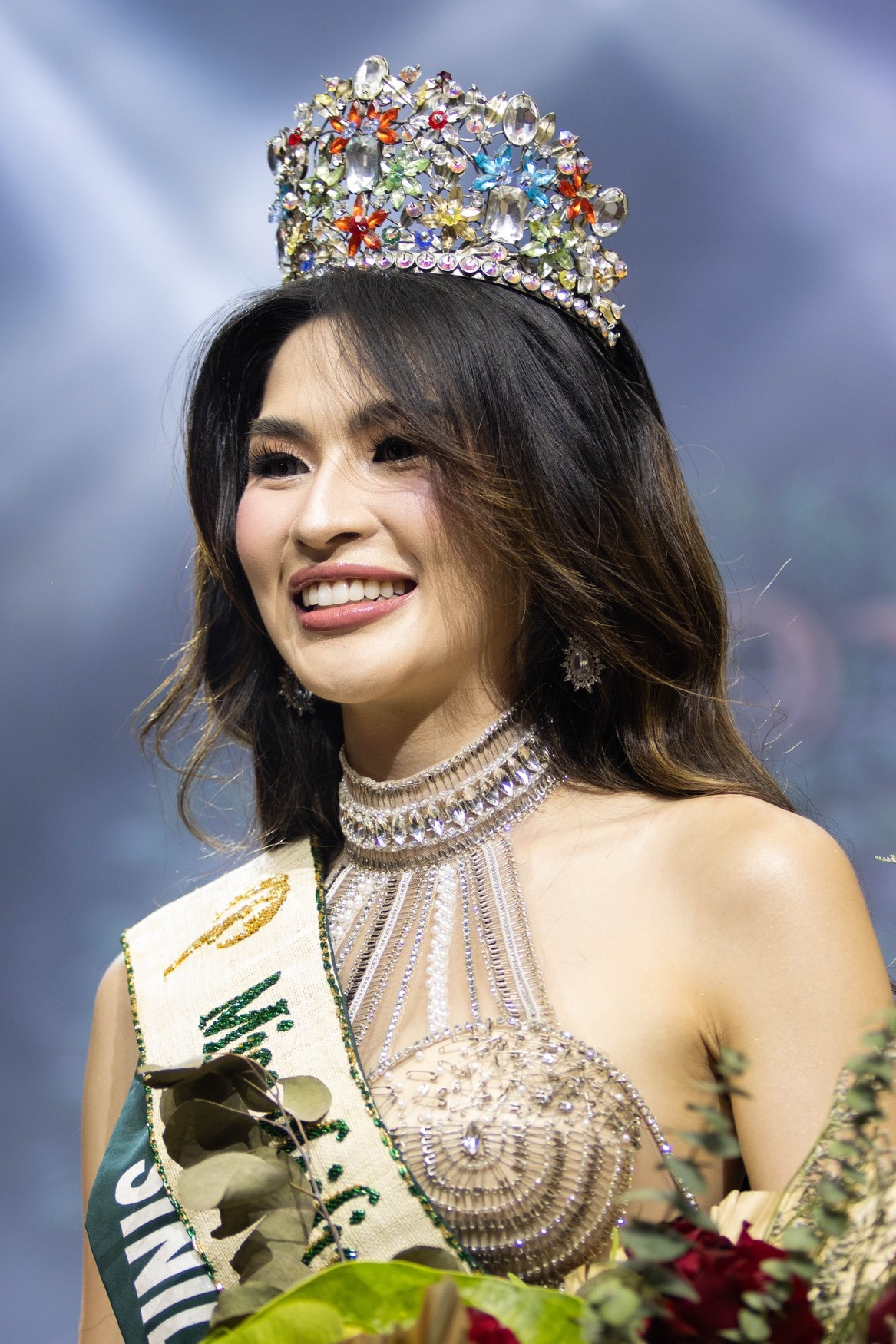
- Yllana Aduana
- Date: April 29, 2023
- Presenters: Robi Domingo; Karla Henry; Jamie Herrell
- Theme: ME Loves 20TREE
- Venue: Toledo City Sports Center, Toledo, Cebu
- Broadcaster: A2Z; Kapamilya Channel; Metro Channel
- Entrants: 28
- Placements: 15
- Withdrawals: Florida; Ipil; Makati; Rizal, Nueva Ecija
- Winner: Yllana Aduana; Siniloan

Miss Philippines Earth 2023 was the 23rd Miss Philippines Earth pageant, held at the Toledo City Sports Center in Toledo, Cebu, on April 29, 2023.

Jenny Ramp of Santa Ignacia crowned Yllana Aduana of Siniloan as her successor at the end of the event. Aduana represented the Philippines at Miss Earth 2023 in Vietnam where she was crowned as Miss Earth – Air 2023.

== Background ==
=== Selection of participants ===
On January 13, 2023, the organization opened the competition.

== Results ==
=== Placements ===
Placement	Contestant
Miss Philippines Earth 2023	Siniloan – Yllana Aduana
Miss Philippines Air 2023	Mangatarem – Kerri Ann Reilly
Miss Philippines Water 2023	Puerto Princesa – Jemimah Joy Zabala
Miss Philippines Fire 2023	Melbourne – Sha'uri Livori
Miss Philippines Eco Tourism 2023	Toledo – Athena Claire Auxillo
Runners-Up	Dipolog – Kriszia Carro Falcasantos; Iloilo City – Ma. Cristina Isabel Tallador; Milan – Queenie Salac; San Jose – Princes Lazaga; Taguig – Alcea de Jesus
Top 15	Balayan – Meri Lasil Relevo; Carrascal – Chrystel Mae Correos; San Pascual – Jeicka Czaverika Dimatatac; Tuburan – Jamie Angelique Armada; Zamboanga City – Fermizulli Silal

== Pre-pageant events ==
=== Special awards ===
Award	Contestant
Hana Beauties	Aurora – Patricia Nicole Yap; Carrascal – Chrystel Mae Correos; Iloilo City – Ma. Cristina Isabel Tallador; Mangatarem – Kerri Reilly; Melbourne – Shau’ri Livori; Puerto Princesa – Jemimah Joy Zabala; Siniloan – Yllana Marie Aduana; Toledo – Athena Auxillo; Tuburan – Jamie Angelique Armada; Zamboanga City – Fermizulli Silal

Competition	Gold	Silver	Bronze	Ref.
Darling of the Press	Yllana Marie Aduana; Siniloan	Nicolle Lagera; California	Meri Lasil Relevo; Balayan	

== Contestants ==
28 contestants competed for the title.

Locality	Contestant	Age (Note: Ages at the time of the pageant)	Region
Aurora, Zamboanga del Sur	Patricia Nicole Yap	22	Mindanao
Balayan	Meri Lasil Relevo	19	Luzon
Brooke's Point	Veronica Sinajon	25	Luzon
California, U.S.	Nicolle Lagera	26	Americas (International)
Carrascal	Chrystel Mae Correos	27	Mindanao
Casiguran, Aurora	Leahrly Curitana	23	Luzon
Dasmariñas	Naoimi Henave	19	Luzon
Dipolog	Kriszia Carro Falcasantos	21	Mindanao
Iloilo City	Ma. Cristina Isabel Tallador	26	Visayas
Jones	Jireh Calacala	26	Luzon
Kalibo	Rowan No	21	Visayas
Laguindingan	Mythosela Villanueva	24	Mindanao
Mabini, Batangas	Iris Mabanta	25	Luzon
Mangatarem	Kerri Ann Reilly	20	Luzon
Mariveles	Joselle Gregorio	26	Luzon
Melbourne, Australia	Sha'uri Livori	19	Oceania (International)
Milan, Italy	Queenie Nhikol Salac	20	Europe (International)
Pantukan	Athena Guardados	24	Mindanao
Puerto Princesa	Jemimah Joy Zabala	26	Luzon
San Jose City	Princes Lazaga	20	Luzon
San Pascual	Jeica Czaverika Dimatatac	23	Luzon
Silang	Shaina Nazario	23	Luzon
Siniloan	Yllana Marie Aduana	24	Luzon
Taguig	Alcea de Jesus	27	Luzon
Toledo	Athena Auxillo	20	Visayas
Tuburan	Jamie Angelique Armada	20	Visayas
Tungawan	Queenzel Daryl Alacio	24	Mindanao
Zamboanga City	Fermizulli Silal	23	Mindanao
