= Siniloan Church =

Roman Catholic church in Laguna, Philippines

- Saints Peter and Paul Parish Church
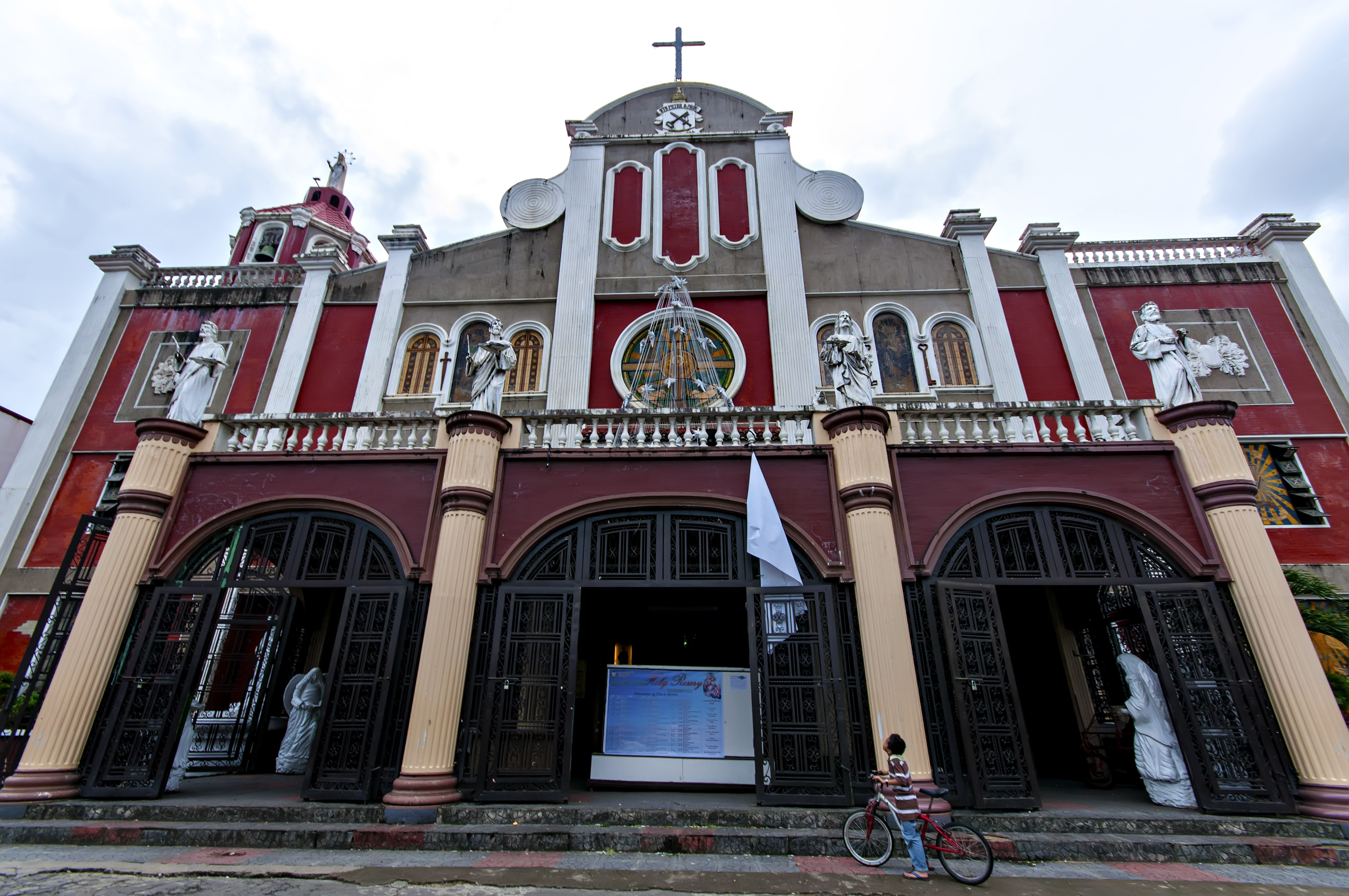
- Church facade in 2013

- Location in Laguna Location in Luzon Location in the Philippines
- 14°25′19″N 121°26′46″E
- Location: Paete-Pakil-Famy Diversion Rd., Bagumbarangay, Siniloan, Laguna
- Country: Philippines
- Denomination: Roman Catholic

History
- Status: Parish church
- Founded: 1604
- Founder(s): Fr. Juan de Placensia and Fr. Diego de Oropesa
- Dedication: Saint Peter and Saint Paul

Architecture
- Functional status: Active
- Architect: Father Melchor de San Antonio
- Architectural type: Church building
- Style: Baroque
- Groundbreaking: 1733
- Completed: 1739

Administration
- Province: Manila
- Metropolis: Manila
- Archdiocese: Manila
- Diocese: San Pablo
- Deanery: Sts. Peter and Paul

Clergy
- Archbishop: Jose Advincula
- Bishop: Marcelino Antonio Maralit
- Priest: Luis Tolentino

Saints Peter and Paul Parish Church, commonly known as Siniloan Church, is the only Roman Catholic church in the municipality of Siniloan, Laguna, Philippines, under the Diocese of San Pablo. Its titular is Saint Peter and Saint Paul, whose feast falls every June 29.

== Church history ==
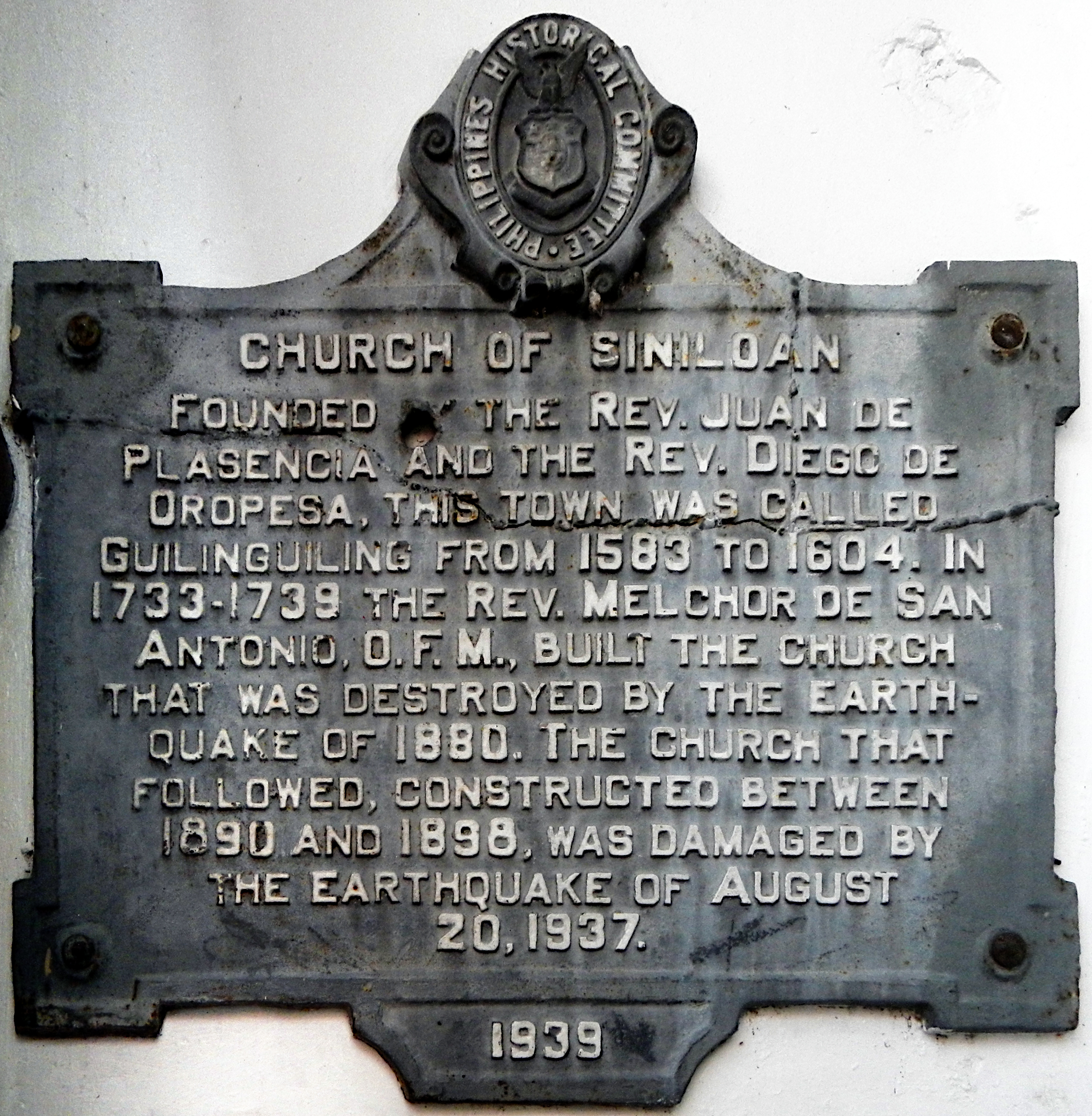
Church PHC historical marker installed in 1939

Siniloan was established as a reduccion by Father Juan de la Plasencia and Father Diego de Oropeza in 1579 and was formalized in 1583 as Guilinguiling. The first church of Siniloan, based on the records of Felix de Huerta, was dedicated to Our Lady of Purification (Purificacion de Nuestra Señora). In 1599, the supreme government allowed the establishment of a stone church. In 1604, the church was placed under the advocacy of Saints Peter and Paul. The old church was built from 1733 to 1739 under the term of Father Melchor de San Antonio. At that time, located north of the church was a small chapel dedicated to Saint Sebastian, the martyr. It was heavily damaged during the 1880 Luzon earthquakes and was rebuilt from 1890 to 1898. Another earthquake in 1937 damaged the church. Due to its restoration, the church practically has no more traces of its classical and Spanish style. For its 400th anniversary in 2004, the church was reconstructed, modernized and remodeled as twice the size of the previous church under Msgr. Mario Rafael M. Castillo. The inauguration of the newly constructed church was held on November 20, 2004, officiated by the then Bishop of San Pablo, Leo M. Drona.

== Gallery ==
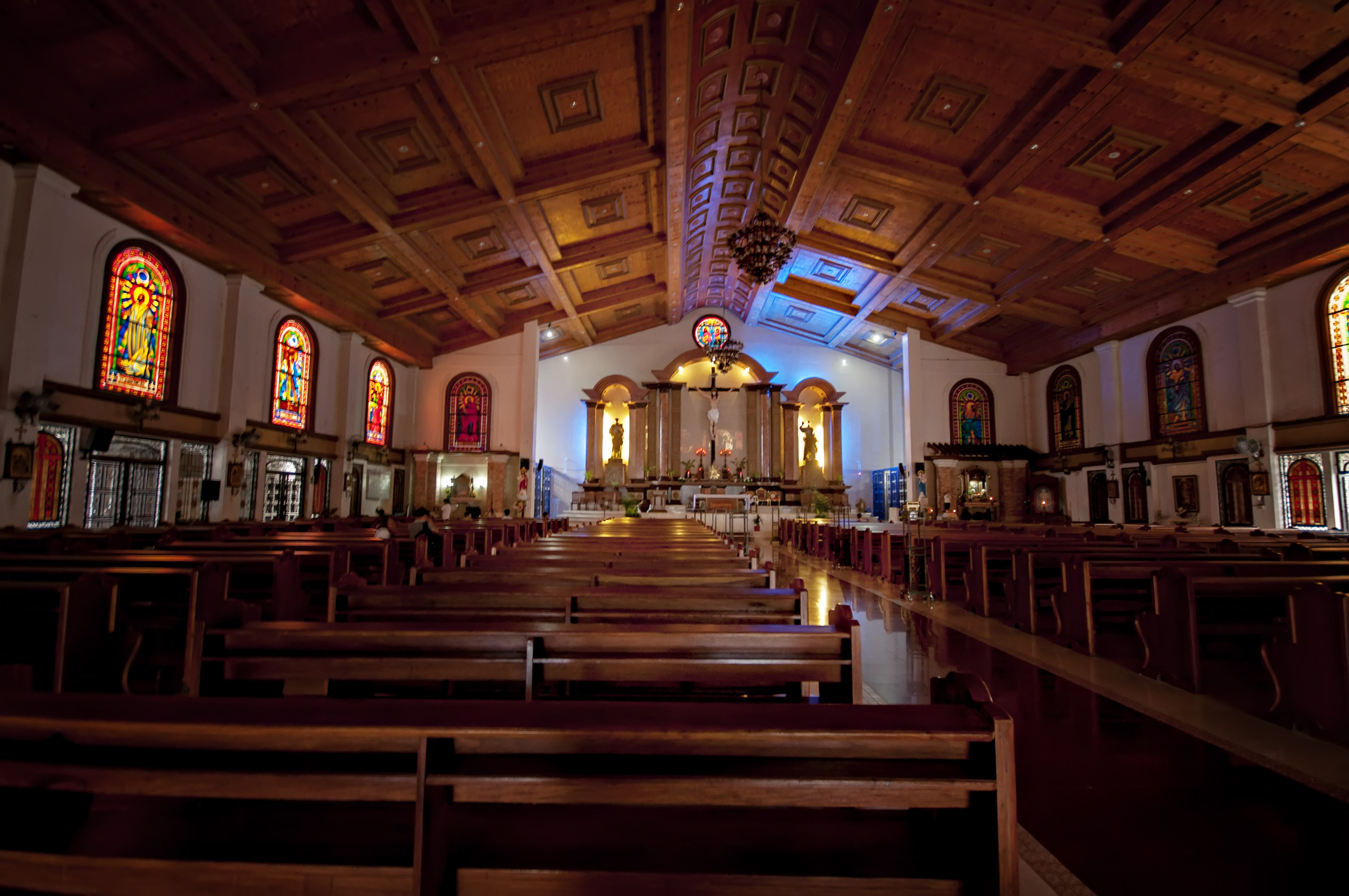
Church interior in 2013

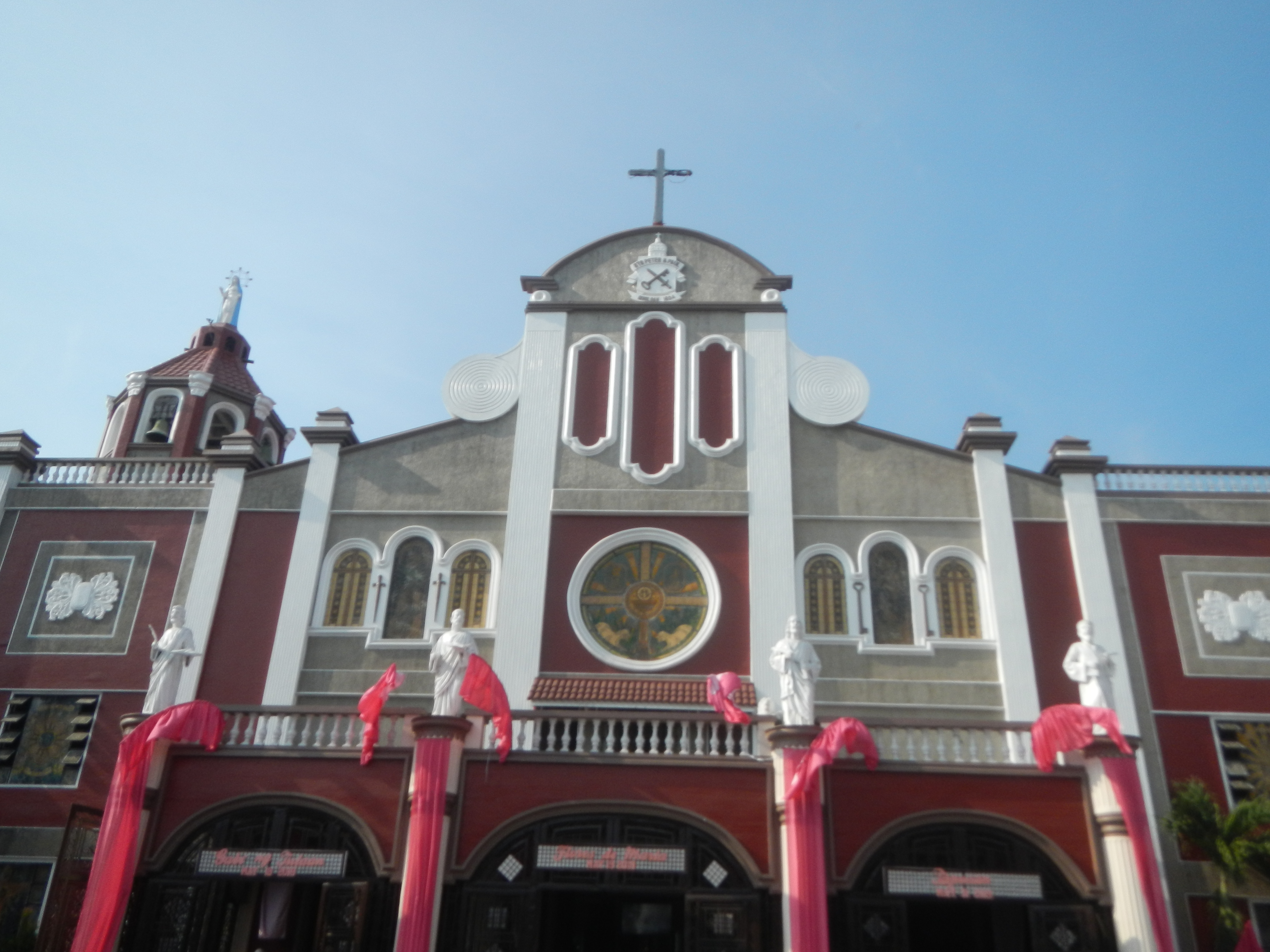
Church facade in 2019

== Bibliography ==
- Huerta, Felix de (1865). Estado geográfico, topográfico, estadístico, histórico-religioso: de la santa y apostólica provincia de S. Gregorio Magno, de religiosos Menores descalzos de la regular y más estrecha observancia de N.S.P.S. Francisco, en las Islas Filipinas: comprende el número de religiosos, conventos, pueblos, situación de estos, años de su fundación, tributos, almas, producciones, industrias, cosas y casos especiales de su administración espiritual, en el archipiélago filipino, desde su fundación en el año de 1577 hasta el de 1865 [Geographical, topographical, statistical, historical and religious state of the holy and apostolic province of S. Gregorio Magno] (in Spanish). Binondo: Imprenta de M. Sanchez y Ca.
