= Santisimo Rosario Integrated High School =

Public high school in Laguna, Philippines

Location
- Brgy. Santisimo Rosario, San Pablo City, Laguna; Philippines; 14°00′04″N 121°18′25″E

Information
- Type: Public Secondary School
- Motto: "Maka-Diyos, Makabayan, Makatao, Makakalikasan" ("For God, Country, Humanity, and Mother Nature")
- Established: 5 June 1995 (31 years, 5 months and 5 days)
- School district: 3rd District of Laguna
- Principal: Glenn Toledo (2023 – Present)
- Faculty: 33 (as of 2017)
- Grades: 7 to 12
- Colors: Aqua green Gray; White
- Team name: Rosarians; Paddy Fielders
- Newspaper: The Paddy Fields (2017 – present)
- Website: srihs.mywebcommunity.org

Santisimo Rosario Integrated High School (Filipino: Pinagsamang Mataas na Paaralan ng Santisimo Rosario, abbreviated as SRIHS or Stmo. Rosario IHS) is a public secondary school located at Barangay Santisimo Rosario, San Pablo City, Laguna, Philippines. It was established in 1995 and offers junior and senior secondary education. The senior high education course consists of agriculture, fisheries, and general education. It is the first public high school in San Pablo City that has produced senior high school graduates since the implementation of the K-12 curriculum by the Department of Education in 2012.

== History ==
=== San Pablo City National High School Santisimo Annex (1995–2004) ===
Due to an increased number of enrollees in San Pablo City National High School (SPCNHS), the school could no longer accommodate all students in the city. To solve the problem, the government of San Pablo City decided to establish satellite schools, called annexes, across the barangays. One of the barangays chosen for establishing a satellite secondary school was Barangay Santisimo. Elias Corales^{†}, the barangay chairman at that time, donated a hectare of land to build a barangay secondary school named Santisimo Rosario Annex, according to city ordinance number 93-3 dated July 1, 1993.

On June 1, 1995, Santisimo Annex started as a single three-room building standing in an open field without fences. Four pioneer teachers were assigned to Santisimo Rosario Annex: Ronie Nacario, who was the first designated as Teacher-in-Charge, Teresa Yema, Maritess Fandiño, and Michelle D. Benedictos. In 1996, Editha L. Fule was assigned as Teacher-in-Charge of Santisimo Annex. Since 1996, additional school buildings have been constructed with the help of the local government, the parents and teachers' association, and non-government organizations.

In 1999, the first commencement exercises (four-year curriculum) of Rosarians were held in Rizal Hall, San Pablo City Central School. In 2001, the school perimeter fence was built. A major school landscape project was initiated by the freshmen in 2003, and the institution hired Jayson Bargados, the first security guard for the school's security. The first computer room was built in 2004 with the help of the Personal Computers for Public Schools program, created by the Department of Trade and Industry.

=== Santisimo Rosario National High School (2005–2018) ===
In 2005, a major restructuring of faculty members occurred. Half of the original faculty members were transferred to other schools, and were replaced with new teachers. In the same year, Santisimo Annex gained independence from San Pablo City National High School and renamed as Santisimo Rosario National High School. After gaining a new school identity, the white-green uniform was replaced by aqua green in June 2006. The use of flash drives as storage devices instead of floppy disks for saving documents was introduced, and another school renovation, led by school volunteer Paulton Sityar, was held in the same year. The school obtained Internet access with the help of the Gearing Up Internet Literacy & Access for Students (GILAS) project in 2007, spearheaded by Airnel Abarra. Also, a treehouse was built inside the campus in preparation for hosting the Science Camp. In 2012, Physical Education uniforms were standardized. Due to the remoteness of Barangay Atisan, which was located on the foot of the Mount Malepunyo, and San Isidro National High School no longer being able to accommodate more students from that barangay, an extension of Santisimo Rosario National High School was established.

As the Department of Education (DepEd) shifted to the K-12 curriculum, Santisimo Rosario NHS gathered accreditation to offer a senior high school program. Due to the proximity of rice fields and other agriculture in Barangay Santisimo, the high school has programs specialized in agriculture, fisheries, as well as a general education track. In 2015, the last students learning with the old curriculum graduated, and within the same year, the senior high school program began. In 2016, the senior high school building was built. The first commencement exercises for senior high school graduates were held on April 6, 2017. The General Academic Studies senior high course was opened in June 2017. Also within the same year, greenhouses were donated by the Department of Agriculture. SRNHS's first and oldest school building was upgraded into a 4-story building to accommodate even more students.

=== Santisimo Rosario Integrated High School (since 2019) ===
In 2019, Santisimo Rosario National High School was renamed to Santisimo Rosario Integrated High School due to the proximity of the senior high school and junior high school buildings, in a declaration by the Department of Education. Later, the SRNHS extension in Brgy. Atisan became a fully independent institution, renamed to the Atisan Integrated School.

== Uniforms ==
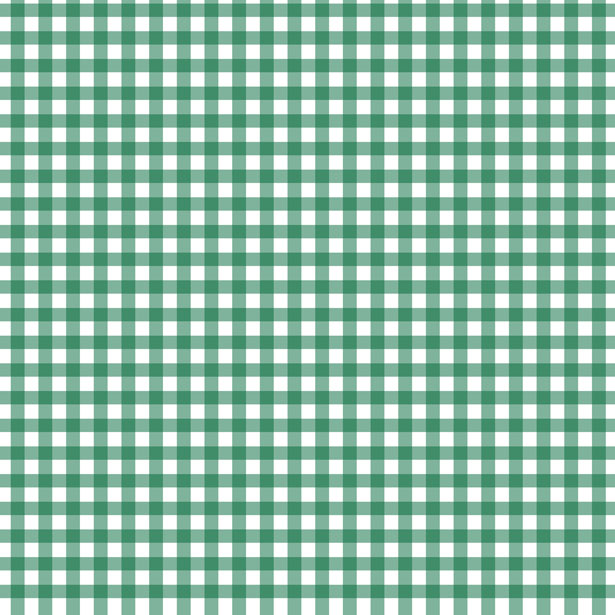
The design pattern used for the girls' uniforms, skirt, and necktie pattern of San Pablo City National High School. Formerly used by SRIHS (1995–2005)

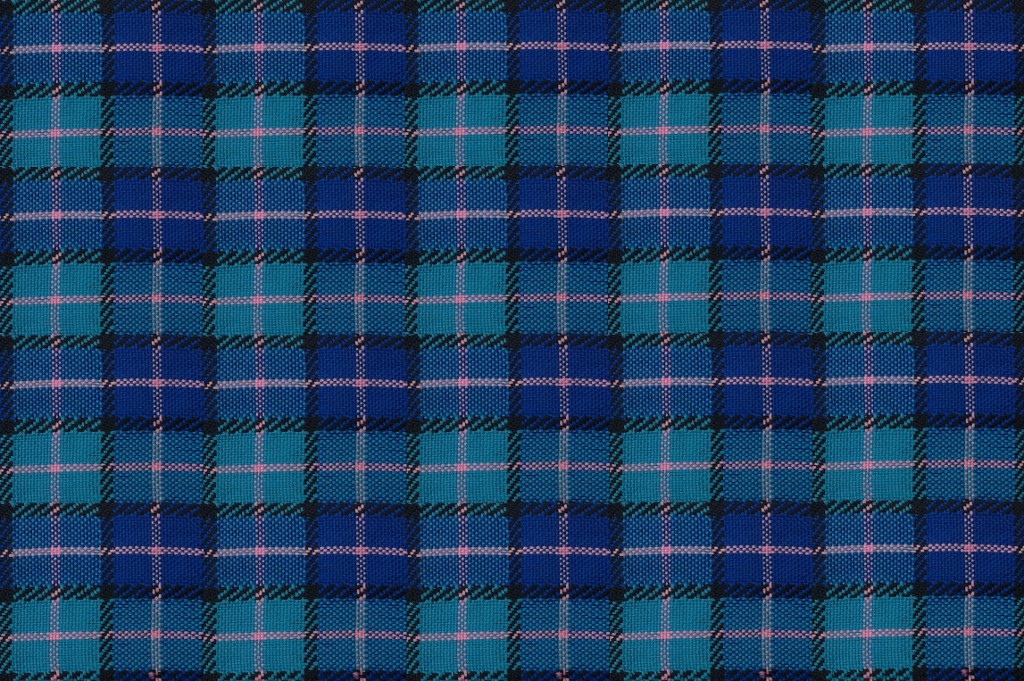
The design pattern used for rosarian girls' blouse, necktie, skirt, and belt (2006–Present)

In the school's earlier years as Santisimo Rosario Annex, the uniform of San Pablo City National High School was used. It was a white polo and slacks for boys. For girls, it was a white blouse, a green checkered necktie and a skirt. The "Tuck-In" (tucked polo clothes) policy for boys was strictly implemented. When it became a National High School, a new uniform was introduced, where the boys wear aqua-green polo and slacks, while the girls wear an aqua-green blouse, navy-blue (with multiple colored grid design) skirts, belt buckles, and necktie. The new uniform was conceived by Editha L. Fule. These new uniforms removed the "Tuck-In" policy which was implemented for boys. On its first deployment, it caught the attention of many private and public schools, mistakenly identified as a newly established school, and the students were always asked what school they came from. Wearing of slacks for senior high school girls and the aqua-green senior high school uniform was introduced in 2015. Physical education uniforms often changed annually until they were standardized in 2012. The standard physical education uniform is an aqua-green T-shirt and gray jogging pants with a dark green strip on the right.

== List of principals and teachers-in-charge ==
Name	Position	Years served
Ronie Nacario	Teacher-in-Charge	1995
Editha L. Fule	Teacher-in-Charge (1996–2005) Principal (2005–2009)	1995–2009
Linda De Leon	Principal	2009–2011
Patrick Henry Ilagan	Principal	2014–2019
Annaliza Ampong	Teacher-in-Charge (2011–2014) Principal (2019–2023)	2011 – 2014 2019 - 2023
Glenn Toledo	Principal	2023–Present

== List of faculty members ==
Name	Subject taught	Years served
Teresa Yema		
Maritess Fandiño		
Michelle D. Benedictos		
Lorelie Caringal Mission	Technology and Livelihood Education (TLE)	2000–Present
Renante M. Bonilla	Music, Arts, Physical Education, and Health (MAPEH)	1996–2005
Analyn N. Nacario	Technology and Livelihood Education (TLE)	1996–2005
Rafaela M. Sarmiento	Mathematics	1996–2009
Noreen C. Aviñante	Mathematics	1996–2009
Gina C. Valencia	Filipino	1996–2005
Perlita V. Delos Angeles	Science	1996–2009
Annaliza Ampong	Mathematics	2005–2012
Gemma Mediana	Science	1996–2005
Rubelyn N. Enero	Music, Arts, Physical Education, and Health (MAPEH)	1996–2009
Sarah J. Sario	English	1996–2005
Jun Pornobe		1995–2000
Nancy Sudario	Araling Panlipunan (AP)	2005–Present
Maritess Punzalan	Technology and Livelihood Education (TLE)	2005–Present
Michelle De Mesa	Filipino	2005–2006
Liberty Quinay	Araling Panlipunan (AP)	2005–2006
Jennifer Sesgundo Dimaranan	Technology and Livelihood Education (TLE)	2005–2009
Michelle Dimaculangan	Technology and Livelihood Education (TLE)	
Rechel A. Rivera	Science	2005–Present
Laila Hermosa Pere Godoy	Filipino	2006–Present
Sherwin Belen	Science	2005–2008
Krishen Labrado	English	2005–2007
Mercedes Prudenciano	English	2006–Present
Imelda Mendoza	Science	2009–Present
Laarni Mejila	Araling Panlipunan (AP)	2009–Present
Rudy Gonzales	Music, Arts, Physical Education, and Health (MAPEH)	2007–Present
Benedict Rapsing		2007–2009
Liezel L. Katigbak		
Jenelyn Aranguren	Mathematics	2008–Present
Alvin Salazar	Technology and Livelihood Education (TLE)	2015–Present
Hazeline Jean Petiza	Technology and Livelihood Education (TLE)	2013–2014
Roxanne Alexandra Calabia	Technology and Livelihood Education (TLE)	2013–2014
Dan Lester Briñas	Mathematics	2015–Present
Cherry Mae Sityar	Mathematics	2015–Present
Kissarah Villanueva	Technology and Livelihood Education (TLE)	2014–Present
Ronnie Nacario	Araling Panlipunan (AP)	1996–2005
Airnel Abarra	Araling Panlipunan (AP)	2006–2008
Ronaldo Dieza	English	2006–2008
Maria Monica Angeles	English	2013–Present
Jayvee De Luna^{†}	Filipino	2016
Rissha Lin Orias	Science	2013–Present
Dana Marie Atienza	English	
Joyce Anne Marace	Music, Arts, Physical Education, and Health (MAPEH)	
Michael Ilag	Filipino	2013–Present
Cherry May Serida		
Loida Sanchez	Mathematics	
Jennylyn Quinay	Filipino	2008–Present
Chona Zacarias	Araling Panlipunan (AP)	2016–Present
Cassandra Palejon	Technology and Livelihood Education (TLE)	2014–Present
Mark Angelo Moreno		
Karen Lyn Canlas	Science	2013–Present
Mary Jane Sunga	Mathematics	
Maria Diana Coquia Oris	English	
Michelle Banca	English	
Redilyn Taa	English	
Myraldine Alina	Science	
Ethel Dasig		
Josephine Reyes	Science	
Faye Maida Llagas	English	
Marjorie Anne Atienza	English	
Johna Balenson	Araling Panlipunan (AP)	
Elaine Fornoles	Music, Arts, Physical Education, and Health (MAPEH)	
Milesa Funatinilla	Filipino	
Angelo Ross Patayan	English	
Myraldine Vendera	Filipino	

== List of school staff ==
Name	Position
Jeff Aquino	A.D.A.S
Rowena Avellana	Disbursing Officer I
Gina Nual	Senior Book Keeper
Jayson Bargados	Security Guard

== List of published newspapers ==
Newspaper Name	Year Published	Language
Bagwis	2002–2003	Filipino
Rosarian	2004–2007	English
The Rosarian Chronicles	2007–2010	English
Dapog	2016	Filipino
The Paddy Fields	2011 – 2015 2017–Present	English

== Awards and achievements ==
Competitions	Year	Rank
District School Press Conference (Sports Writing)	2002	Filipino – 2nd and 3rd Place; English – 3rd Place
Division School Press Conference	2004	Copyreading; English – 2nd Place; Filipino – 2nd Place; Headline Writing – 2nd Place; Sports Writing – 3rd Place; Editorial Cartooning (Filipino) – 3rd Place; News Writing (Filipino) – 3rd Place
Division School Press Conference	2008	Photojournalism; English – 2nd Place; Filipino – 1st Place; Editorial Cartooning – 3rd Place
Division School Press Conference	2009	Editorial Writing – 1st Place; Copyreading – 3rd Place; News Writing – 3rd Place
Division School Press Conference	2010	Editorial Cartooning – 1st Place; Editorial Writing – 2nd Place
Division School Press Conference	2011	Editorial Cartooning – 2nd Place; Photojournalism (Filipino) – 2nd Place
Division School Press Conference	2014	Science and Health Writing; English – 1st Place; Filipino – 2nd Place; Editorial Writing (Filipino) – 1st Place; Editorial Cartooning (Filipino) – 2nd Place; Copyreading – 1st Place; Photojournalism (Filipino) – 1st Place
Division School Press Conference	2015	Feature Writing (English) – 2nd Place
Division School Press Conference	2016	Sci and Health writing; English – 3rd Place; Filipino – 3rd Place; Editorial Cartooning (Eng) – 1st Place
Division School Press Conference	2017	Feature Writing; English – 2nd Place; Copyreading; Filipino – 3rd Place; Headline Writing; Filipino – 3rd Place
Division School Press Conference	2019	Copyreading; English – 2nd Place; Headline Writing; English – 2nd Place; News Writing; English – 4th Place
Mary Help of Christian Crusade Slogan Making Contest	2011	2nd Place
Rotary Club Poster Making Contest	2009	3rd Place
Pandibisyong Timpalak Bigkasan (Division Speech Contest)	2011	2nd Place
STI Tagisan ng Talino	2009	Champion
Mathematics Teachers Association of the Philippines (MTAP) Quiz	2008	2nd Place
Division Science Quiz Bee	2008	2nd Place
Division Sci-Dama	2005	2nd Place
Division Sci-Dama	2008	2nd Place
Division Sci-Dama	2010	3rd Place
Division Sub-Camp Quiz Bee (Written)	2011	1st Place
Sabayang Pagbigkas (Cluster A District)	2011	1st Place
On-The-Spot Drawing Contest (Cooperative Month Celebration)	2011	3rd Place
Division Intercampus Bible Quiz	2010	2nd Place
Technolympics	2013	Fish Experimental Dish – 1st Place; Hair and Make-up – 2nd Place; Landscaping – 3rd Place
Technolympics	2016	Main Dish – 2nd Place; Dessert and Beverage – 3rd Place
Division Science Camp, Hydro-rocket Propulsion	2011	1st Place
Division Wellness Competition	2014	2nd Place
TLE Zumba Contest	2014	3rd Place
Regional Marian Contest	2011	Poster Making Contest – 1st Place
Regional Marian Contest	2013	Writing Contest – 3rd Place; Slogan Making Contest – 2nd Place
Population Quiz Bee	2011	3rd Place
Population Quiz Bee	2013	2nd Place
Revitalized Academic Competition in English (RACE)	2011	2nd Place
Revitalized Academic Competition in English (RACE)	2013	1st Place
Revitalized Academic Competition in English (RACE)	2014	2nd Place
Revitalized Academic Competition in English (RACE)	2015	2nd Place
Southern Tagalog CALABARZON Athletes Association (STCAA)	2013	Arnis – Gold; Chess – Gold
San Pablo City Division Meet	2004	6 Gold
San Pablo City Division Meet	2008	2 Gold, 5 Silver, 2 Bronze
San Pablo City Division Meet	2010	3 Gold, 1 Silver
San Pablo City Division Meet	2011	1 Gold, 1 Silver, 4 Bronze
San Pablo City Division Meet	2013	4 Gold, 15 Silver, 8 Bronze
San Pablo City Division Meet	2014	1 Silver, 6 Bronze
Coco Festival Street Dancing Competition	2013	3rd Place
Coco Festival Street Dancing Competition	2015	Champion; Best Choreography; Liveliest Group
Coco Festival Street Dancing Competition	2017	Champion; Best Choreography; Liveliest Group
Coco Cooking Festival	2016	Main Course – 3rd Place; Dessert – 2nd Place; Beverage – 3rd Place
Coco Cooking Festival	2017	Main Course – 3rd Place; Dessert – 1st Place
Provincial Elimination Quiz Bee	2017	2nd Place
Fiesta Republica Dulansangan (National Category)	2017	3rd Place
La Laguna Festival	2017	Street dancing – 2nd Place (San Pablo Representative)
Vedic Mathematics Olympiad	2019	Team Category – 3rd Place; Individual Category – 3rd Place
Division-based Buwan ng Wika	2019	Spoken Poetry – 1st Place; Extemporaneous Speech – 2nd Place; Dulyawit – 2nd Place
