= Jenny Ramp =

Filipina beauty pageant titleholder

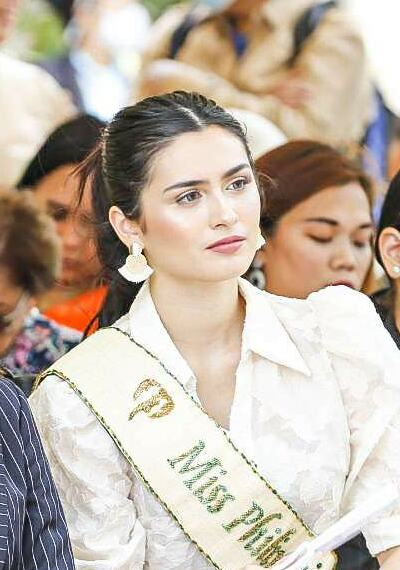
- Ramp in 2023
- Born: Jennylynn Sinead Domingo Ramp; February 7, 2003 (age 23); Santa Ignacia, Tarlac, Philippines
- Education: Holy Angel University, (Psychology)
- Height: 1.70 m (5 ft 7 in)
- Beauty pageant titleholder
- Title: Miss Philippines Earth 2022
- Major competitions: Miss Philippines Earth 2022; (winner); Miss Earth 2022; (top 20)

Jennylynn Sinead Domingo Ramp, popularly known as Jenny Ramp (born February 7, 2003) is a Filipina beauty pageant titleholder who was crowned Miss Philippines Earth 2022. She represented the Philippines at Miss Earth 2022 and was placed in the top 20.

== Early life and education ==
Ramp is from Santa Ignacia, Tarlac, in the Philippines. She studied for her bachelor's degree in psychology at Holy Angel University in Angeles City, Pampanga.

== Pageantry ==
=== Miss Philippines Earth 2022 ===
On March 12, 2022, she represented Santa Ignacia, Tarlac on Bb. Kanlahi 2022 and was third runner up. On August 6, 2022, she represented Santa Ignacia, Tarlac at the Miss Philippines Earth 2022 pageant in Coron, Palawan, Philippines and was crowned the winner succeeding Naelah Alshorbaji of Parañaque.

=== Miss Earth 2022 ===
She represented the Philippines in Miss Earth 2022 and was placed in the top 20.

Awards and achievements
Preceded by Naelah Alshorbaji (Parañaque)	Miss Philippines Earth; 2022	Succeeded by Yllana Aduana (Siniloan, Laguna)
