= Laguna State Polytechnic University =

Public university in Laguna, Philippines

- Pambansang Pamantasang Politekniko ng Laguna (Filipino)
- Former names: Baybay Provincial High School (1952–1957); Baybay Agricultural and Vocational School (1957–1971); Baybay National College of Agriculture and Technology (1971–1983); Laguna State Polytechnic College (1983–2007)
- Motto: Integrity. Professionalism. Innovation.
- Type: Public state university
- Established: 1952; 74 years ago
- Academic affiliations: Philippine Association of State Universities and Colleges (PASUC); State Colleges and Universities Athletic Association (SCUAA); Agricultural Colleges Association of the Philippines (ACAP)
- President: Dr. Mario R. Briones
- Vice-president: Atty. Rushid Jay S. Sancon (VP for Academic Affairs); Engr. Beltran P. Pedrigal (VP for Administration); Dr. Robert C. Agatep (VP for Research, Development, and Extension)
- Undergraduates: Approx. 35,000 (2023)
- Postgraduates: Approx. 2,000 (2023)
- Location: Santa Cruz, Laguna, Philippines; 14°15′46″N 121°23′51″E
- Campus: Main: Santa Cruz, Laguna Regular: San Pablo City, Laguna; Los Baños, Laguna; Siniloan, Laguna Satellite: Magdalena, Laguna; Nagcarlan, Laguna; Liliw, Laguna; Lopez, Quezon
- Hymn: LSPU Hymn
- Colors: Light Blue and Yellow
- Nickname: Ka-Piyu
- Sporting affiliations: SCUAA
- Mascot: LSPU Lakers
- Website: lspu.edu.ph

Laguna State Polytechnic University (LSPU; Filipino: Pambansang Pamantasang Politekniko ng Laguna) is a State University in the province of Laguna, Philippines, with four regular campuses and four satellite campuses. It is currently classified as SUC Level III and is the only institutionally accredited state university in the Calabarzon region, as certified by the Accrediting Agency of Chartered Colleges and Universities in the Philippines (AACCUP).

LSPU offers 52 multidisciplinary undergraduate and graduate programs through 15 academic colleges and departments. The university's programs cover fields such as Agriculture, Fisheries, Teacher education, Engineering, Business and Accountancy, Computer Studies, Arts and Sciences, Industrial technology, Criminal Justice Education, Nursing, Law, Hospitality, and Tourism management.

Each regular campus has its own flagship specialization: Engineering in Santa Cruz (Main Campus), Agriculture in Siniloan (Host Campus), Teacher Education and Technology in San Pablo City Campus, and Fisheries in Los Baños Campus. Satellite campuses are located in Magdalena, Nagcarlan, Liliw, and Lopez, Quezon.

The university is ISO 9001:2015 certified for quality management and has consistently received government recognition including performance-based bonuses from 2020 to 2022. The San Pablo City Campus College of Teacher Education is recognized by the Commission on Higher Education (CHED) as a Center of Development in Teacher Education.

In 2023, LSPU was ranked 46th among the top 100 universities in the Philippines by EduRank. The university has also increased its global linkages and research output, with 47.76% of research outputs published in internationally refereed or CHED-recognized journals and 21 projects utilized by industry and other beneficiaries within the same year.

LSPU was established through Republic Act No. 9402 in 2007, converting the former Laguna State Polytechnic College into a university. Its current president is Dr. Mario R. Briones, who assumed office in 2019.

== History ==
The origins of what is now the Laguna State Polytechnic University (LSPU) date back to 1952, when it was established as the Baybay Provincial High School (BPHS) in Siniloan, Laguna. It was the first public high school based in the shoreline (“baybay”) district of Laguna de Bay, and the second in the province.

=== Early Transformation and Agricultural Education (1957–1983) ===
In June 1957, the school was converted into the Baybay National Agricultural and Vocational School (BNAVS) by virtue of Republic Act No. 1807. During this period, BNAVS became a training center for the Peace Corps Volunteers under the PACD-BVE Training Center for rice production, producing over 680 graduates. In school year 1968–1969, the Manpower Training Center also began operations.

In December 1969, BNAVS became the pilot institution for the two-year Agricultural Technician Curriculum under the Associate in Agriculture program. The transformation continued in June 1971, when BNAVS was converted into the Baybay National College of Agriculture and Technology (BNCAT). Degree programs such as the Bachelor of Science in Agriculture (1975–76) and Bachelor of Science in Agricultural Education (1977–78) were introduced.

BNCAT became a recipient of national and international development programs. It was chosen as one of the Experimental Agricultural High Schools (EAHS) under the Educational Development Projects Implementing Task Force (EDPITAF), benefiting from infrastructure support funded by the World Bank. It was also part of the Agricultural Education Outreach Project (AEOP) by the USAID from 1980 to 1983, focusing on research and extension development.

=== State College Era and Campus Expansion (1984–2007) ===
On June 11, 1984, through Batas Pambansa Blg. 482, BNCAT was converted into the Laguna State Polytechnic College (LSPC), with Dr. Ricardo A. Wagan appointed as the first college president in 1986. Under his leadership, the college expanded its facilities, programs, and presence in the region.

In 1993, the institution was designated by the DECS as one of seven Provincial Technical Institutes of Agriculture (PTIA) in Region IV under the AusAID-AGRITECH project. It opened satellite campuses through agreements with local government units and initiated the integration of CHED-supervised institutions into the LSPC system.

The integration was formalized by:

- CHED Memorandum No. 18, s. 1999, and CHED Memorandum No. 27, s. 2000.
- Under Republic Act No. 8292 and the General Appropriations Act of 1999 (RA 8745).

The following campuses were integrated:

- Laguna College of Arts and Trades → LSPC–Sta. Cruz Main Campus
- Los Baños College of Fisheries → LSPC–Los Baños Campus
- San Pablo City National School of Arts and Trades → LSPC–San Pablo City Campus (formal turnover on December 11, 2000)

This period also marked the creation of the Graduate Studies and Applied Research (GSAR) units in all campuses, and the acquisition of modern laboratory equipment, including speech labs, computer labs, and science laboratories.

=== University Status and Institutional Growth (2007–present) ===
On March 4, 2007, the college was officially converted into a state university through Republic Act No. 9402, renaming it as the Laguna State Polytechnic University (LSPU).

Dr. Nestor M. De Vera succeeded Dr. Wagan in 2011 and served as the second university president. The leadership of Dr. Mario R. Briones began in 2019. Under his administration, LSPU achieved significant milestones in instruction, research, extension, and institutional recognition.

By 2023, LSPU had:

- Been ranked 46th among the top 100 universities in the Philippines by EduRank
- Attained ISO 9001:2015 certification for quality management systems
- Recognized as the only institutionally accredited SUC in Calabarzon by AACCUP
- Achieved Performance-Based Bonuses for three consecutive years (2020–2022)
- Maintained Centers of Development (COD) designation, notably in Teacher Education by CHED

LSPU continues to expand its reach with four satellite campuses (Magdalena, Nagcarlan, Liliw, and Lopez, Quezon), and further develops its flagship programs in Engineering, Agriculture, Fisheries, and Teacher education across its regular campuses.

== Campuses ==
Siniloan Campus

Four regular campuses belong to the university. The campus in Siniloan was founded in 1952 (as Baybay National High School), where the university traces its roots. It sits on a land of 33 hectares (82 acres) at Barangay Wawa besides Laguna de Bay, with an additional 100 hectares (250 acres) for future expansion plans in the mountainous Barangay Kapatalan. It concentrates on Agriculture and Computer Studies.

Santa Cruz Campus

The main campus is situated in the provincial capital town, Santa Cruz. Founded in 1957, initial operations began three years after, in 1960. It occupies 7 hectares (17 acres) of land at Barangay Bubukal. It concentrates on Engineering, Nursing and Allied Health, Hospitality Management and Tourism, Arts and Sciences, Business Management and Accountancy, Criminal Justice Education, and Law.

San Pablo City Campus

The San Pablo City Campus located at Barangay Del Remedio was founded in 1957 and began operations in 1960. With 6 hectares (15 acres) of land, it is a "Center of Development" in Teacher Education (CHED Memorandum Order 17, series of 2016) and also concentrates on Industrial Technology.

Los Baños Campus

LSPU Los Baños Campus was founded in 1957 and started operations in 1959. It sits on a land area of 12 hectares (30 acres) in Barangay Mayondon-Malinta and concentrates on Fisheries, and Food Nutrition, and Dietetics.

Auxiliary sites

There are also two satellite campuses in Nagcarlan, Laguna, and in Lopez, Quezon, a manpower extension campus in Magdalena, Laguna, and two International Language Studies Centers in Thai Nguyen University, Vietnam, and Changwon Moonsung University, South Korea.

== Governance and organization ==
=== Board of Regents ===
The University's governance is vested in the Board of Regents (or Lupon ng mga Rehente), commonly abbreviated as BOR. The board, with its ten members, is the highest decision-making body of the LSPU System.

The chairperson of the Commission on Higher Education (CHED) serves as the board's chairperson, while the president of the Laguna State Polytechnic University is the vice-chairperson. The chairpersons of the Committees of Higher Education of the Senate and the House of Representatives are also members, concurrent with their functions as committee chairpersons.

The regional directors of the Department of Science and Technology (DOST) and the National Economic and Development Authority (NEDA), Region IV-A Calabarzon, also serve as regular members.

The LSPU students, represented by the Federated Supreme Student Council (FSSC), nominate a Student Regent. While a Faculty Regent is likewise appointed by the faculty members of the whole University through the LSPU Faculty Association (LSPU FA). Alumni are represented by the President of the LSPU Alumni Association. Their membership is coterminous with their respective terms, while the remaining two members are from the Private Sector who are prominent citizens of the Province of Laguna.

	Regent	
Chairperson	Hon. Shirley C. Agrupis, PhD	Chairman, Commission on Higher Education
Vice-Chairperson	Hon. Mario R. Briones, EdD	President, Laguna State Polytechnic University
Member	Hon. Senator Loren Legarda	Chairman, Senate Committee on Education, Culture and Arts
Member	Hon. Congressman Jude A. Acidre	Chairperson, House Committee on Higher and Technical Education
Member	Hon. Emelita P. Bagsit	Regional Director, Department of Science and Technology - Region IV-A
Member	Hon. Agnes E. Tolentino, CESO III	Regional Director, National Economic and Development Authority - Region IV-A
Member	Vacant	Federated President, LSPU Faculty Association
Member	Hon. Chester Alexis C. Buama, PhD	Federated President, LSPU Alumni Association
Member	Hon. Mary Lysabelle San Luis	Federated President, LSPU Supreme Student Council
Member	Hon. Atty. Eleno O. Peralta	Private Sector Representative
Member	Hon. Alexander R. Madrigal, PhD	Private Sector Representative

=== University President ===
The University is headed by the University President, appointed by the board, who has a renewable of a four-year term. Mario R. Briones, EdD, is the incumbent University President. Elected to office by the Board of Regents on March 21, 2019, Dr. Briones is the third President of the University, succeeding Dr. Ricardo A. Wagan (2007-2012) and Dr. Nestor M. De Vera (2012-2019) respectively.

Background

Prior into becoming the University President, Dr. Briones assumed various administrative positions such as Director of Extension Services, Dean of the College of Computer Studies, Director of Resource Generation and Outsourcing, Chairperson of the Student Affairs and Services, Director of Safety Management Services, Deputy Campus Director, and Campus Director among others.

President Briones is a recipient of a number of recognitions conferred by the university such as the two Presidential Recognitions from the two former university presidents of LSPU, and other government agencies such as regional ABS-CBN Gawad Kalinga and academe-industry partners in Malaysia and Vietnam.

Presidents of Laguna State Polytechnic University
Name	Tenure of office
Dr. Ricardo A. Wagan	1987–February 7, 2011; (OIC) February 8-May 2, 2011
Dr. Nestor M. De Vera	May 3, 2011 – May 2, 2019
Dr. Eden C. Callo	(OIC) May 3–20, 2019
Dr. Mario R. Briones	May 21, 2019–present

== Courses ==
The following lists are the academic programs offered by the university in the different colleges (source: LSPU Annual Report, 2024)

College of Teacher Education (CHED Center of Development in Teacher Education)

- Doctor of Philosophy in Education (Major in Educational Leadership and Management, Educational Management, English Language Education, Edukasyong Pangwika sa Filipino, Mathematics Education, Science Education)
- Doctor of Education (Major in Educational Management)
- Master of Arts in Education (Major in: Educational Management, English, Filipino, Guidance and Counseling, Mathematics, Physical Education, Science and Technology, Social Science, Technology and Livelihood Education)
- Bachelor of Secondary Education (Major in: English, Filipino, Mathematics, Science, Social Studies, Values Education)
- Bachelor of Physical Education
- Bachelor of Early Childhood Education
- Bachelor of Elementary Education
- Bachelor of Technology and Livelihood Education (Major in: Industrial Arts, Information and Communication Technology, Home Economics)
- Bachelor of Technical-Vocational Teacher Education (Major in: Architectural Drafting Technology, Electrical Technology, Electronics Technology, Food Service Management)
- Certificate in Teaching Proficiency

College of Computer Studies

- Master of Science in Information Technology
- Bachelor of Science in Information Technology
- Bachelor of Science in Computer Science
- Bachelor of Science in Information System
- Associate in Computer Technology

College of Fisheries

- Master of Science in Fisheries
- Bachelor of Science in Fisheries
- Bachelor of Science in Fisheries Business Management
- Bachelor of Science in Fishery Education

College of Agriculture

- Doctor of Philosophy in Agriculture
- Master of Science in Agriculture
- Master of Science in Agricultural Education
- Bachelor of Science in Agriculture (Major in: Animal Science, Crop Science, Organic Agriculture)
- Bachelor of Science in Agricultural Education
- Bachelor of Science in Agricultural Technology
- Bachelor of Science in Agribusiness

College of Business, Management and Accountancy

- Doctor of Public Administration
- Master of Public Administration
- Bachelor of Arts in Public Administration
- Bachelor of Science in Accountancy
- Bachelor of Science in Business Administration (Major in: Marketing Management, Financial Management)
- Bachelor of Science in Entrepreneurship
- Bachelor of Science in Office Administration

College of Hospitality Management and Tourism

- Bachelor of Science in Hospitality Management
- Bachelor of Science in Hotel and Restaurant Management
- Bachelor of Science in Tourism
- Bachelor of Science in Tourism Management
- Diploma in Hotel and Restaurant Management

College of Nursing

- Master of Science in Nursing
- Bachelor of Science in Nursing
- Diploma in Midwifery

College of Engineering

- Bachelor of Science in Agricultural Engineering
- Bachelor of Science in Agricultural and Biosystems Engineering
- Bachelor of Science in Civil Engineering
- Bachelor of Science in Computer Engineering
- Bachelor of Science in Electrical Engineering
- Bachelor of Science in Electronics Engineering
- Bachelor of Science in Mechanical Engineering

College of Arts and Sciences

- Bachelor of Arts in Broadcasting
- Bachelor of Science in Biology
- Bachelor of Science in Chemistry
- Bachelor of Science in Mathematics
- Bachelor of Science in Psychology
- Intensive English Language Proficiency

College of Criminal Justice Education

- Bachelor of Science in Criminology

College of Industrial Technology

- Bachelor of Science in Industrial Technology (Major in: Architectural Drafting Technology, Automotive Technology, Electrical Technology, Electronics Technology, Food Technology, Garments Technology, Refrigeration and Air-conditioning)
- Associate in Technology

College of Food Nutrition and Dietetics

- Bachelor of Science in Nutrition and Dietetics
- Bachelor of Science in Food Technology
