= Laguna College =

Private college in Laguna, Philippines

- Former name: Laguna Academy
- Motto: Scientia, Patria, Libertas (Latin)
- Motto in English: Knowledge, Country, Liberty
- Type: Private, Nonsectarian, Co-educational
- Established: 1923
- President: Dr. Lavinia S. Evangelista-Bruan
- Location: Paseo de Escudero, San Pablo City, Laguna, Philippines; 14°04′21″N 121°19′35″E
- Hymn: Laguna College Hymn
- Colors: Blue and White
- Nickname: LC
- Website: www.lagunacollege.edu.ph
- Location in Laguna Location in Luzon Location in the Philippines

The Laguna College, more popularly known by its initials LC, is a private, nonsectarian, co-educational institution located in San Pablo City, Laguna, Philippines. It offers elementary, junior high school, senior high school, college, graduate studies.

== History ==
Don Zacarias Sahagun and Don Melecio Fule founded the Laguna Academy in 1923 to provide secondary schooling to the people of San Pablo City and its neighboring towns.

The Laguna Academy, considered the largest provincial private secondary institution in Luzon up to the outbreak of the recent war, was established as a solution to one of the pressing educational problems of the times. The academy began with 16 students and reached an enrollment of 1,500 in 1941.

Upon the death of the first two presidents of the board of trustees and co-founders of the institution, Don Melecio Fule and Don Zacarias Sahagun (a municipal president of San Pablo who was responsible for the opening of a town government hospital), one of the academy's alumni in the person of Dr. Nicasio B. Sahagun, physician and educator, took the reins of the school administration in 1938. He and Mr. Alfredo Evangelista, treasurer of the institution, with the moral and material support of the other members of the board exerted much effort in the establishment of a junior normal college. The war of 1941, however, forced the closing of the Laguna Academy and it remained closed during the years of the Japanese occupation.

With the liberation of the city of San Pablo in 1945, the academy resumed its educational mission. Amid tremendous handicap, for the institution had all its equipment and facilities damaged and its buildings destroyed during the war, the board of trustees reopened the institution. Under its new name, Laguna College, it offers kindergarten, elementary, special science curriculum and RBEC-based high school, college, and graduate school courses which, together, make up a student population of several thousands.

In 1996, it was granted Accreditation Status (Level II) for its courses in liberal arts, education, and commerce by the Philippine Association of Colleges and Universities - Commission on Accreditation (PACU-COA). It was re-accredited Level II in 2005.

Since 2011, the school’s president has been Dr. Lavinia S. Evangelista-Bruan.

== Gallery ==
College Building

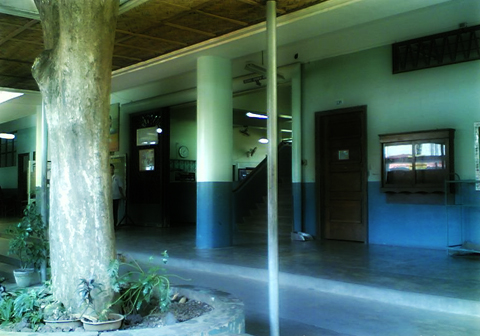
The Legendary Banaba

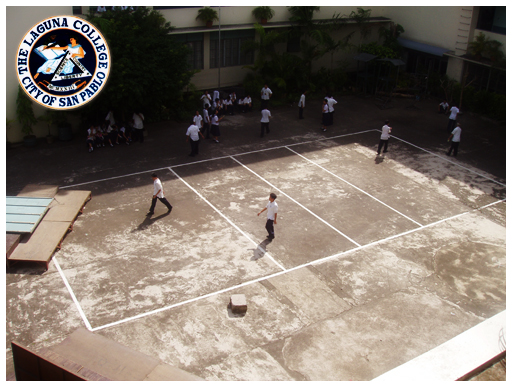
The Quadrangle

== Academic programs ==
=== College degree programs ===
- Bachelor of Science in Accountancy (BSA)
- Bachelor of Science in Management Accounting (BSMA)
- Bachelor of Science in Accounting Information Systems (BSAIS)
- Bachelor of Science in Business Administration (BSBA)
  - Major in Financial Management
  - Major in Operations Management
  - Major in Marketing Management
  - Major in Human Resource Management
  - Major in Business Economics
- Bachelor of science in electronics and communication engineering
- Bachelor of Science in Industrial Engineering (BSIE)
- Bachelor of Science in Civil Engineering (BSCE)
- Bachelor of Science in Nursing
- Bachelor of Arts in Economics
- Bachelor of Arts in English
- Bachelor of Elementary Education
  - Major in Mathematics
  - Major in Science
  - Major in Health Education
- Bachelor of Secondary Education
  - Major in English
  - Major in Filipino
  - Major in General Science
  - Major in Home Economics and Technology
  - Major in Mathematics
- Bachelor of Science in Computer Science
- Bachelor of Science in Information Technology
- Bachelor of Science in Psychology
- Bachelor of Science in Hotel and Restaurant Management
- Bachelor of Science in Tourism Management

=== Graduate degree programs ===
- Master in Business Management
  - Thesis Program
  - Non-Thesis Program
- Master in Public Administration
- Master of Arts in Education
  - Major in Administration and Supervision
  - Major in Educational Management
  - Major in Mathematics
  - Major in Reading

=== Senior high school ===
- ABM Strand
- STEM Strand
- HUMSS Strand

=== High school ===
- Special SCIENCE Curriculum (SSC)
- Regular Curriculum
- Grades 7-12

=== Grade school ===
- Kindergarten
- Grades 1-6

== Organizations ==
- Laguna College High School Class Organization - Junior High School
- Laguna College Student Council -Senior High School
- Laguna College Supreme Student Council
- Laguna College Accounting Society (An Affiliate of National Federation of Junior Philippine Institute of Accountants)
- Laguna College Management Society
- Laguna College Educators' Circle
- Laguna College Association of Psychology Students
- Computer Science Council
- Glee Club
- Science Club
- Math Club
- English Communication Arts Club
