= Naelah Alshorbaji =

Filipino-Syrian model

- Born: Naelah Alshorbaji (Note: Naelah Alshorbaji was born in Syria. Thus, she does not possess her mother's maiden name.); January 27, 1998 (age 28); Damascus, Syria
- Other name: Nana
- Occupations: Model; beauty pageantry
- Height: 1.73 m (5 ft 8 in)
- Beauty pageant titleholder
- Title: Miss Philippines Earth 2021
- Major competitions: Miss Philippines Earth 2021 (Winner); Miss Earth 2021 (Top 8)

Naelah Alshorbaji (Arabic: نائلة الشربجي; born January 27, 1998), is a Filipino-Syrian model and beauty pageant contestant who was crowned Miss Philippines Earth 2021. She represented the Philippines at the Miss Earth 2021 pageant and finished as a Top 8 semifinalist.

== Early life and education ==
Alshorbaji was born in Damascus, Syria, on January 27, 1998, to a Syrian father and a Filipina mother. She recalls her time there being surrounded by the family's farm animals. In 2011, She and her family moved to the Philippines due the Syrian civil war.

== Pageantry ==
=== Miss Philippines Earth 2021 ===
In 2021, Alshorbaji joined the Miss Philippines Earth 2021 competition. At the end of the event, she was crowned Miss Philippines Earth 2021 succeeding Roxanne Allison Baeyens.

=== Miss Earth 2021 ===
As the winner of Miss Philippines Earth 2021, Alshorbaji represented the Philippines at the Miss Earth 2021 pageant on November 21, 2021 and finished as a Top 8 Finalist.

== Notes ==
Awards and achievements
Preceded by Roxie Baeyens (Baguio)	Miss Philippines Earth; 2021	Succeeded by Jenny Ramp (Santa Ignacia, Tarlac)
