= Siniloan =

Municipality in Laguna, Philippines

Siniloan Guiling-guiling
- Municipality
- Municipality of Siniloan
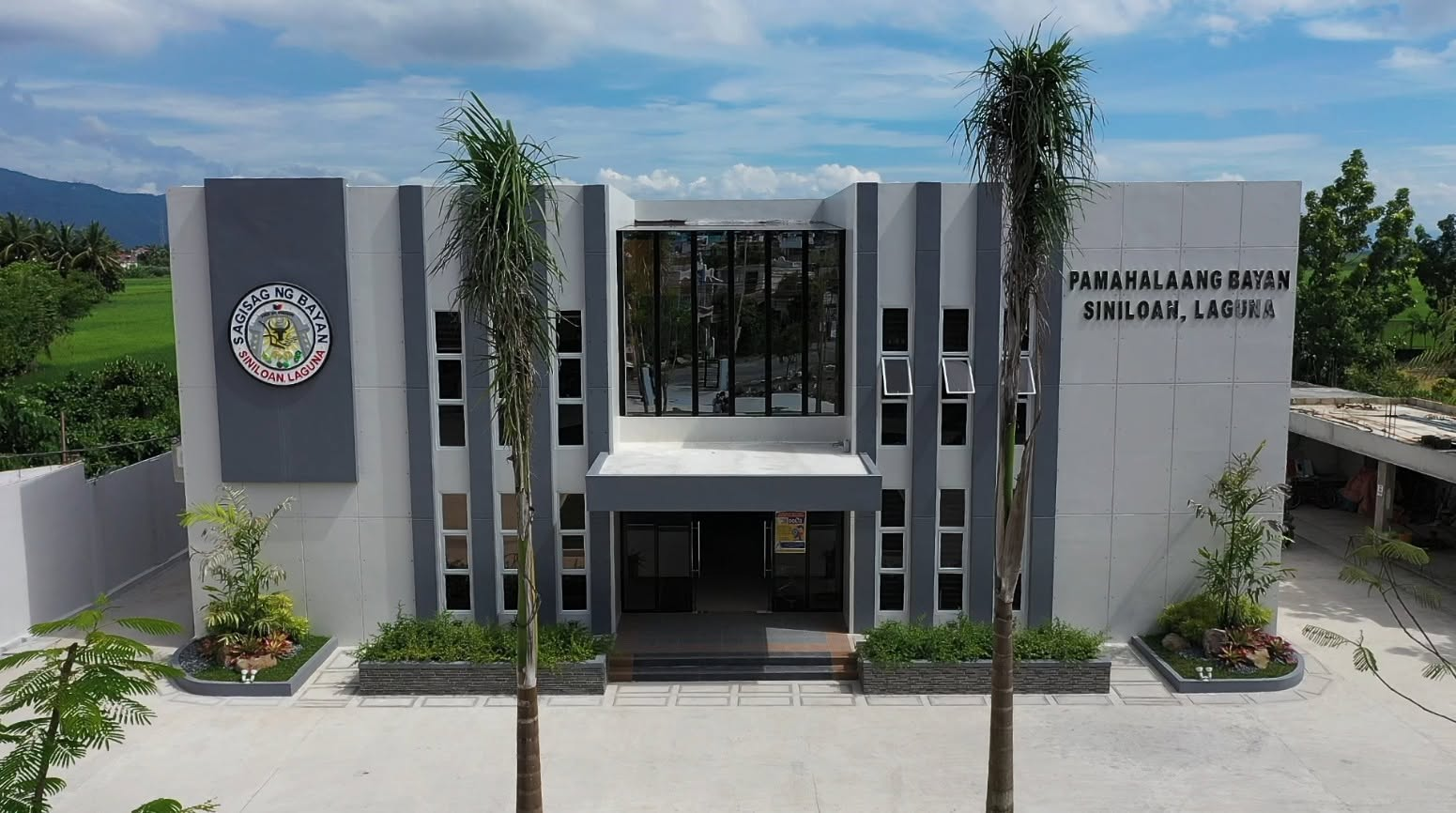

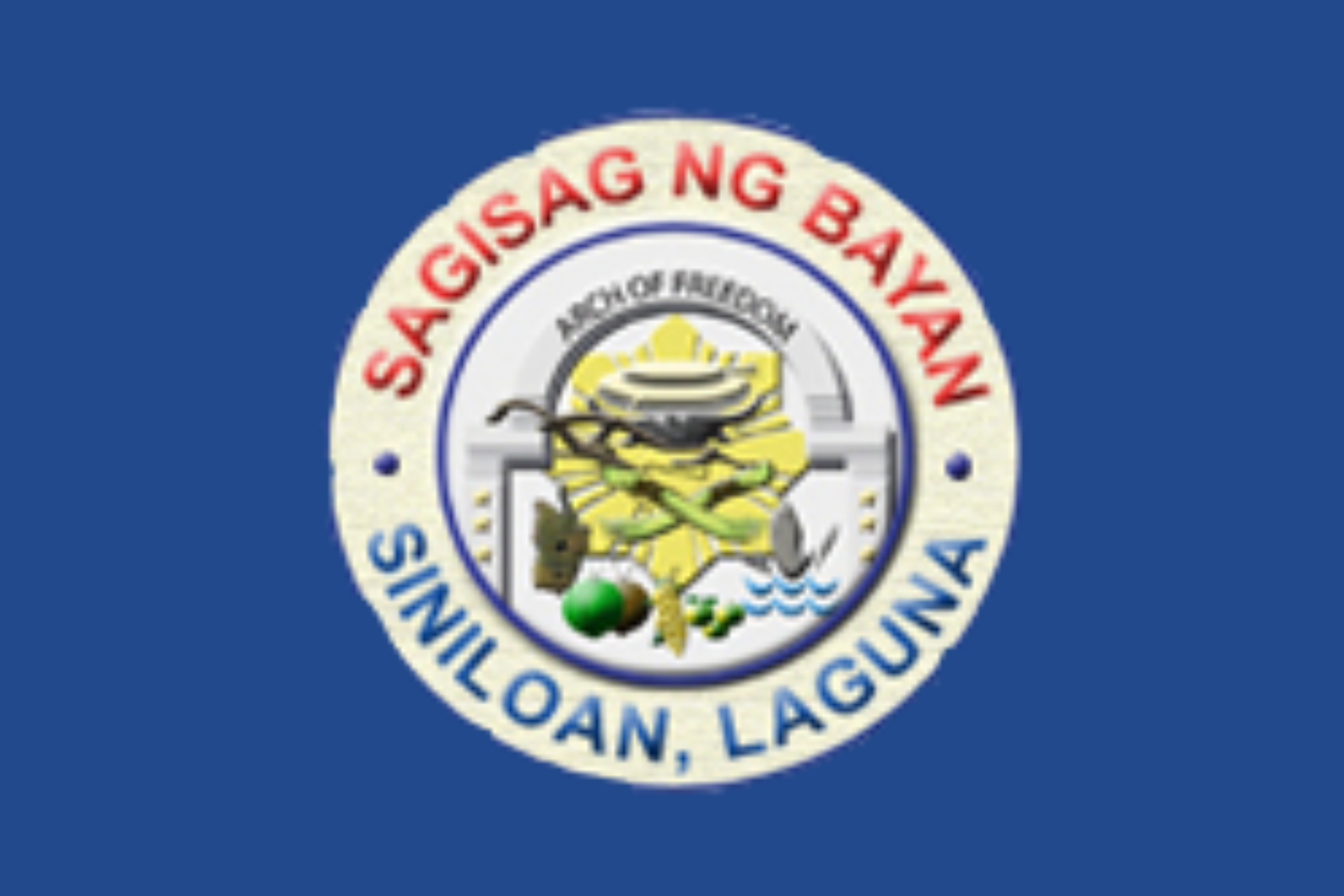
- Flag Seal
- Nickname: A Waterfall Sanctuary
- Motto: Siniloan, GO with me!
- Map of Laguna with Siniloan highlighted
- Interactive map of Siniloan
- Location within the Philippines
- Coordinates: 14°25′N 121°27′E
- Country: Philippines
- Region: Calabarzon
- Province: Laguna
- District: 4th district
- Founded: June 29, 1583
- Barangays: 20 (see Barangays)

Government
  - Type: Sangguniang Bayan
  - Mayor: Patrick Ellis Z. Go
  - Vice Mayor: Joseph Metzler D. Masacupan
  - Representative: Benjamin Cueto "Benjie" Agarao Jr.
  - Municipal Council: Members: Dangal Jemimah R. Tibay; Rejnerr F. De Jesus; Carl Anthony S. Puño; Aristeo A. Lauresta; Mauro P. Adofina; John Allan A. Basilan; Louie Philip J. Castro; Marsan A. Pascual
  - Electorate: 26,242 voters (2025)

Area
  - Total: 64.51 km^{2} (24.91 sq mi)
- Elevation: 225 m (738 ft)
- Highest elevation: 630 m (2,070 ft)
- Lowest elevation: 0 m (0 ft)

Population (2024 census)
  - Total: 42,533
  - Density: 659.3/km^{2} (1,708/sq mi)
  - Households: 9,564
- Demonym: Siniloeño

Economy
  - Income class: 1st municipal income class
  - Poverty incidence: 15.97% (2023)
  - Revenue: ₱ 256.4 million (2024)
  - Assets: ₱ 566.4 million (2024)
  - Expenditure: ₱ 113 million (2024)
  - Liabilities: ₱ 225.6 million (2024)

Service provider
  - Electricity: First Laguna Electric Cooperative (FLECO)
  - Water: Siniloan Water District (SIWADI)
- Time zone: UTC+8 (PST)
- ZIP code: 4019
- PSGC: 0403429000
- IDD : area code: +63 (0)49
- Native languages: Tagalog
- Patron saint: Saint Peter and Saint Paul
- Website: siniloan.laguna.com.ph

Siniloan, officially the Municipality of Siniloan (Tagalog: Bayan ng Siniloan), is a 1st-class municipality in the province of Laguna, Philippines. According to the 2024 census by the Philippine Statistics Authority (PSA), it has a population of 42,533 people, with a population density of approximately 660 persons per square kilometer.

Siniloan lies between the plains of the Sierra Madre Mountains and Laguna de Bay, bounded between Mabitac on the west, Pangil on the east, Real, Quezon on the north, and Laguna de Bay on the south. A river named Rio Romelo runs through the center of the town and is used for fishing ground and irrigation purposes. It is 26 kilometres (16 mi) from the provincial capital, Santa Cruz, 113 kilometres (70 mi) from Manila via the South Luzon Expressway, and 74 kilometres (46 mi) from Lucena.

it is strategically positioned as a center of education, commerce, and transportation, acting as a hub for nearby towns in eastern Laguna as well as select areas in the provinces of Quezon and Rizal. The municipality features active business and trade activities, supported by its role as a commercial center with retail shops, markets, and services catering to residents and visitors from surrounding communities.

== Etymology ==
From the early period of Spanish colonialisation, some female inhabitants of the place were milling their palay in their fields. While they were working, some Spaniards (Spanish Colonizers), came and asked them, "Como se llama esta pueblo?" The natives, not knowing Spanish thought that they were asked what they were doing and one of them answered, "camí po ay gumiguiling". The Spaniards repeated, "Guiling-Guiling", to which the natives nodded. The area was then referred to as "Guiling-Guiling" from 1583 to 1604.

Another story has it that during the later part of the year 1604, three brothers, namely, Juan Puno, Juan Pili, and Juan Puhuwan, migrated into this community. They selected a lot adjacent to the river Río Romelo and divided it equally among themselves. When the parish priest saw the ingenuity of the three brothers in equally dividing the land, he asked the natives how equally was expressed in Tagalog. The natives gave him the expression "Sinloan". Right then and there, the name Guiling-Guiling was changed to Siniloang which meant justice, equality and fairness. The word travelled from mouth to mouth with sound variations. Because of the difficulty of some Spaniards in pronouncing Siniloang, the name Siniloan struck and became the official name of this town.

The name Siniloan is also believed to have been taken from a legendary story about Luis and Ana, a married couple who chased a wild boar from a place called Luisiana. They ran after that big boar from Luisiana to Cavinti (kapit sa Binti). The people along the way who saw Luis and Ana chasing the boar took pity on them and helped them to catch it. The people chased the boar through the towns of Lumbán, Kalayaan, Loñgos, Paéte, Paquil, and Pañguil until they finally caught the boar in this town by means of the lassoed captivity or Siniloan.

== History ==
=== Spanish colonial period (16th-19th centuries) ===
Before the arrival of the Spaniards, the area was populated by indigenous Tagalog communities. Siniloan is one of the oldest towns in Laguna. It was established as a reducción by Franciscan missionaries Friar Juan de Plasencia and Friar Diego de Orpesa around 1579 to 1583. On June 29, 1583, Sinilóan formally came to be as a town when Don Juan de Salcedo arrived and the parish was established jointly by Friar Diégo de Orpesa and Friar Juan de Plasencia.

The first church (initially of nipa and bamboo) was dedicated to Our Lady of Purification. A stone church was built starting in 1733 by a Franciscan Friar, Fr. Melchor de San Antonio and later placed under patronage of Saints Peter and Paul. Several barrios were separated over time:

- Santa Maria (formerly Barrio Caboan) was officially separated in 1602.
- Mabitac was officially separated in 1613.
- Famy (formerly Barrio Calumpang) and Pangil were officially separated in 1910.

During the Spanish era, Siniloan was known for its rice fields and natural resources. It played a minor role in the broader colonial evangelization of Laguna.

=== 19th century to Philippine Revolution and American period ===
During the American colonial period, the town of Siniloan underwent territorial expansions and followed contractions due to administrative reorganization policies implemented and made by the United States government. On October 12, 1903, the Philippine Commission enacted Act No. 939, which was designed to reduce the number of municipalities in the Province of La Laguna from thirty down to nineteen for more centralized administration (And to lessen administrative costs). Under Section 1, Paragraph 2 of this statute, the independent municipalities of Famy and Pangil were formally consolidated and absorbed into the territory of Siniloan, with Siniloan designated as the centralized seat of the municipal government.

The consolidated arrangement, however proved to be temporary as local administrative requirements shifted over the next decade. The collective barrios and territories were eventually restored to their independent statuses. Famy was officially separated from Siniloan to re-establish its status as a distinct municipality through Executive Order No. 72, series of 1909, an administrative directive that took full effect in 1910. Around this same historical juncture, Pangil was likewise segregated from Siniloan, restoring the original jurisdictional boundaries of the respective northern Laguna towns.

During the Philippine-American War, Siniloan served as a strategic military base and garrison town for the United States Army in northeastern Laguna. On September 17, 1900, U.S. troops from the 15th and 37th Infantry Regiments, advancing from their garrison in Siniloan, launched a major offensive to attack Filipino forces entrenched in the neighboring town of Mabitac. Following the tactical victory of Filipino General Juan Cailles at the Battle of Mabitac, the defeated American forces retreated back to their staging area in Siniloan.

=== World War II and Japanese occupation (1942-1945) ===
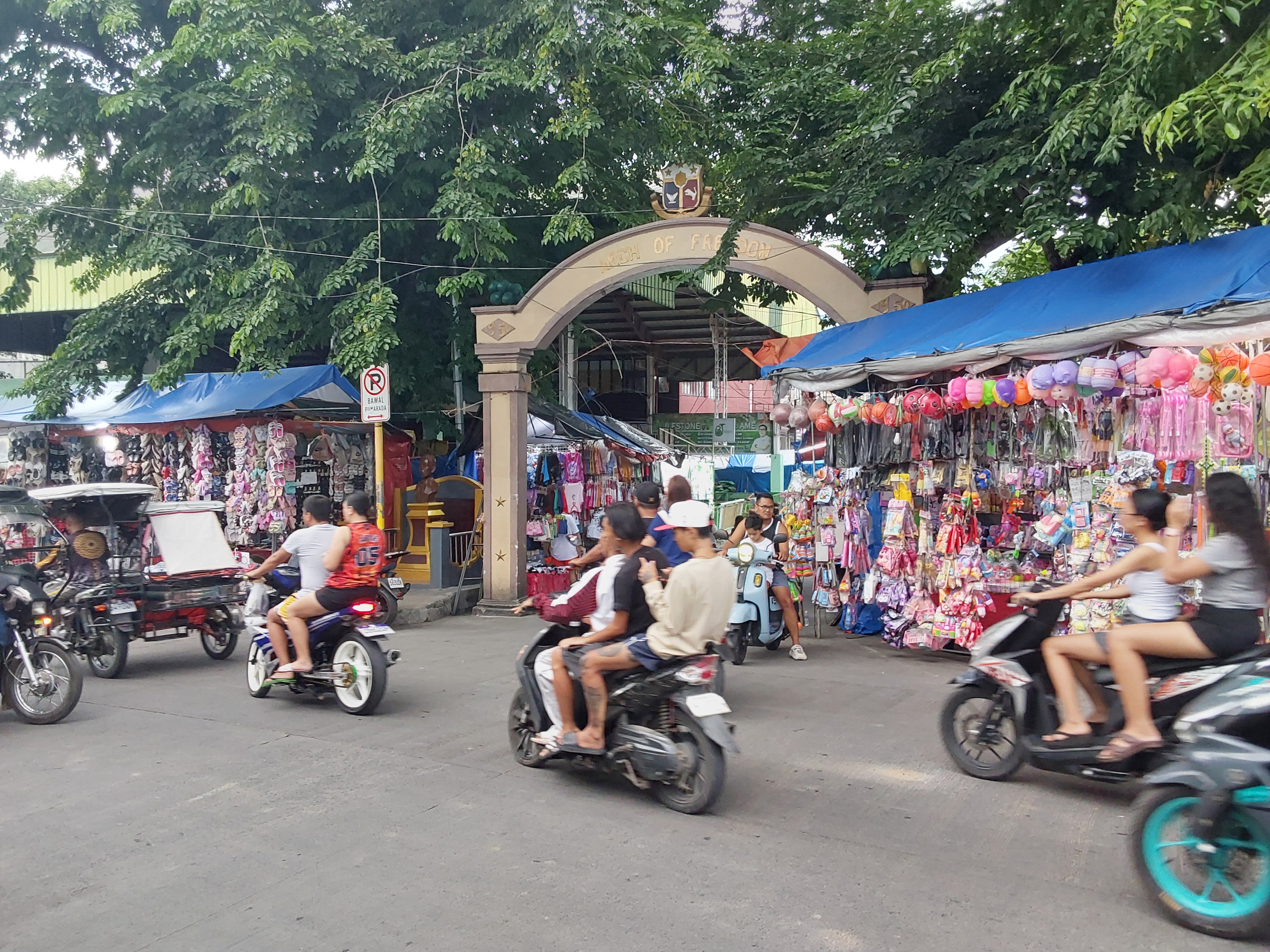
Arch Of Freedom Siniloan (2026)

Like much of Laguna, Siniloan suffered during the Japanese occupation. The town had a local guerrilla unit, the "Siniloan Volunteer Corps", led by figures such as Delfin Redor, which supported American and Filipino forces against the Japanese. The Arch of Freedom in Plaza Delfin Redor commemorates local WWII heroes and sacrifices.

The broader Laguna guerrilla campaign was active, with multiple resistance groups operating in the province.

=== Post-war and independent Philippines (1946-present) ===
During the administration of President Diosdado Macapagal, the municipality of Siniloan was recognized for its local governance. On August 25, 1963, the municipal council, led by Mayor Inocencio Adrias and 1st Councilor Jose Crisostomo, received a special presidential award for excellence in public service, presented alongside Laguna Governor Felicisimo San Luis.

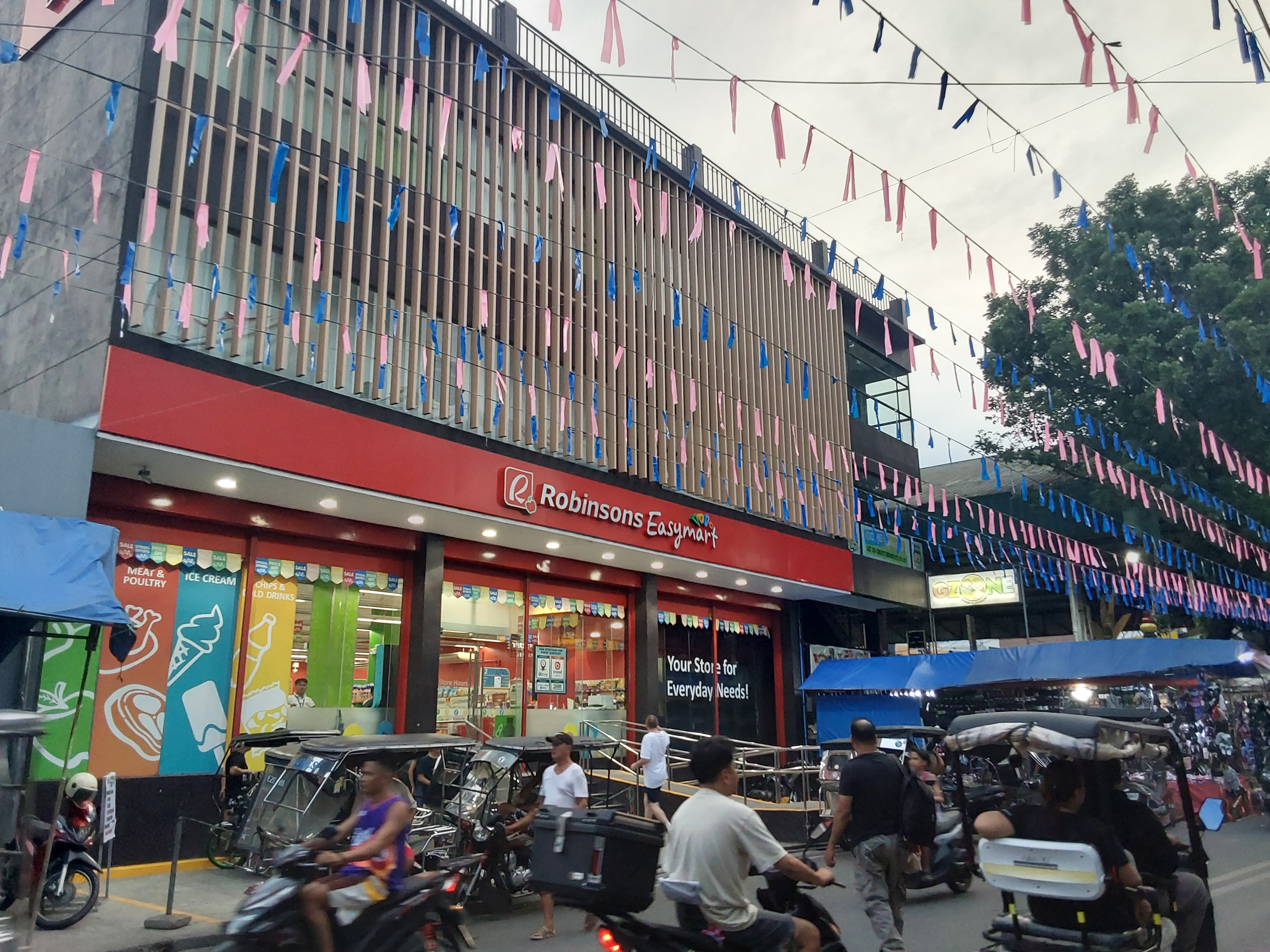
Robinson's EasyMart Siniloan

The old Municipal Police Station near the plaza was demolished and its entire police force relocated. It paved the way for more economic development of commercial services, It was replaced by a franchise of Robinson's EasyMart.

== Geography ==
Siniloan is politically subdivided into 20 barangays, as indicated in the matrix below. Each barangay consists of puroks and some have sitios.

Currently, there are 13 barangays which are classified as urban and the rest are rural.

PSGC	Barangay	Population			±% p.a.	
		2024		2010		
043429001	Acevida	3.0%	1,294	1,406	▾	−0.57%
043429002	Bagong Pag-asa (Poblacion)	1.5%	636	559	▴	0.89%
043429003	Bagumbarangay (Poblacion)	0.3%	118	213	▾	−3.99%
043429004	Buhay	2.6%	1,110	1,089	▴	0.13%
043429005	G. Redor (Poblacion)	0.6%	239	674	▾	−6.89%
043429006	Gen. Luna	3.0%	1,294	1,360	▾	−0.34%
043429007	Halayhayin	11.4%	4,847	3,923	▴	1.47%
043429008	J. Rizal	1.0%	418	458	▾	−0.63%
043429009	Kapatalan	3.8%	1,630	2,525	▾	−2.97%
043429010	Laguio	1.9%	797	549	▴	2.60%
043429011	Liyang	1.4%	601	618	▾	−0.19%
043429012	Llavac	3.4%	1,428	1,943	▾	−2.10%
043429013	Macatad	7.1%	3,034	2,161	▴	2.37%
043429014	Magsaysay	5.6%	2,375	1,611	▴	2.71%
043429015	Mayatba	1.0%	405	419	▾	−0.23%
043429016	Mendiola	14.1%	5,978	5,091	▴	1.11%
043429017	P. Burgos	11.3%	4,805	2,599	▴	4.32%
043429018	Pandeno	8.2%	3,474	3,379	▴	0.19%
043429019	Salubungan	4.6%	1,947	1,739	▴	0.78%
043429020	Wawa	7.1%	3,030	3,044	▾	−0.03%
	Total		42,533	35,345	▴	1.28%

== Climate ==
Climate data for Siniloan, Laguna
Month	Jan	Feb	Mar	Apr	May	Jun	Jul	Aug	Sep	Oct	Nov	Dec	Year
Mean daily maximum °C (°F)	26 (79)	27 (81)	29 (84)	31 (88)	31 (88)	30 (86)	29 (84)	29 (84)	29 (84)	29 (84)	28 (82)	26 (79)	29 (84)
Mean daily minimum °C (°F)	22 (72)	22 (72)	22 (72)	23 (73)	24 (75)	25 (77)	24 (75)	24 (75)	24 (75)	24 (75)	24 (75)	23 (73)	23 (74)
Average precipitation mm (inches)	58 (2.3)	41 (1.6)	32 (1.3)	29 (1.1)	91 (3.6)	143 (5.6)	181 (7.1)	162 (6.4)	172 (6.8)	164 (6.5)	113 (4.4)	121 (4.8)	1,307 (51.5)
Average rainy days	13.4	9.3	9.1	9.8	19.1	22.9	26.6	24.9	25.0	21.4	16.5	16.5	214.5
Source: Meteoblue

== Demographics ==
Population census of Siniloan
Year	Pop.	±% p.a.
1903	3,675	—
1918	3,913	+0.42%
1939	4,692	+0.87%
1948	5,450	+1.68%
1960	9,149	+4.41%
1970	12,413	+3.09%
1975	14,386	+3.00%
1980	17,220	+3.66%
1990	22,759	+2.83%
1995	26,914	+3.19%
2000	29,902	+2.28%
2007	34,877	+2.15%
2010	35,363	+0.50%
2015	38,067	+1.41%
2020	39,460	+0.76%
2024	42,533	+1.82%
Source: Philippine Statistics Authority

In the 2024 census, the population of Siniloan was 42,533 people, with a density of 660 inhabitants per square kilometre or 1,700 inhabitants per square mile.

=== Religion ===
Religion in Siniloan is predominantly Roman Catholic, accounting for about 90% of the population. Approximately 7% adhere to Protestant and other Christian denominations, while around 3% are Muslim. The town’s patron saints are Saint Peter and Saint Paul (San Pedro y San Pablo), along with the Black Nazarene (Nazareno Negro or Cristo Negro). The annual town fiesta is celebrated on June 29.

== Economy ==
Poverty incidence of Siniloan (%)

Source: Philippine Statistics Authority

== Tourism ==
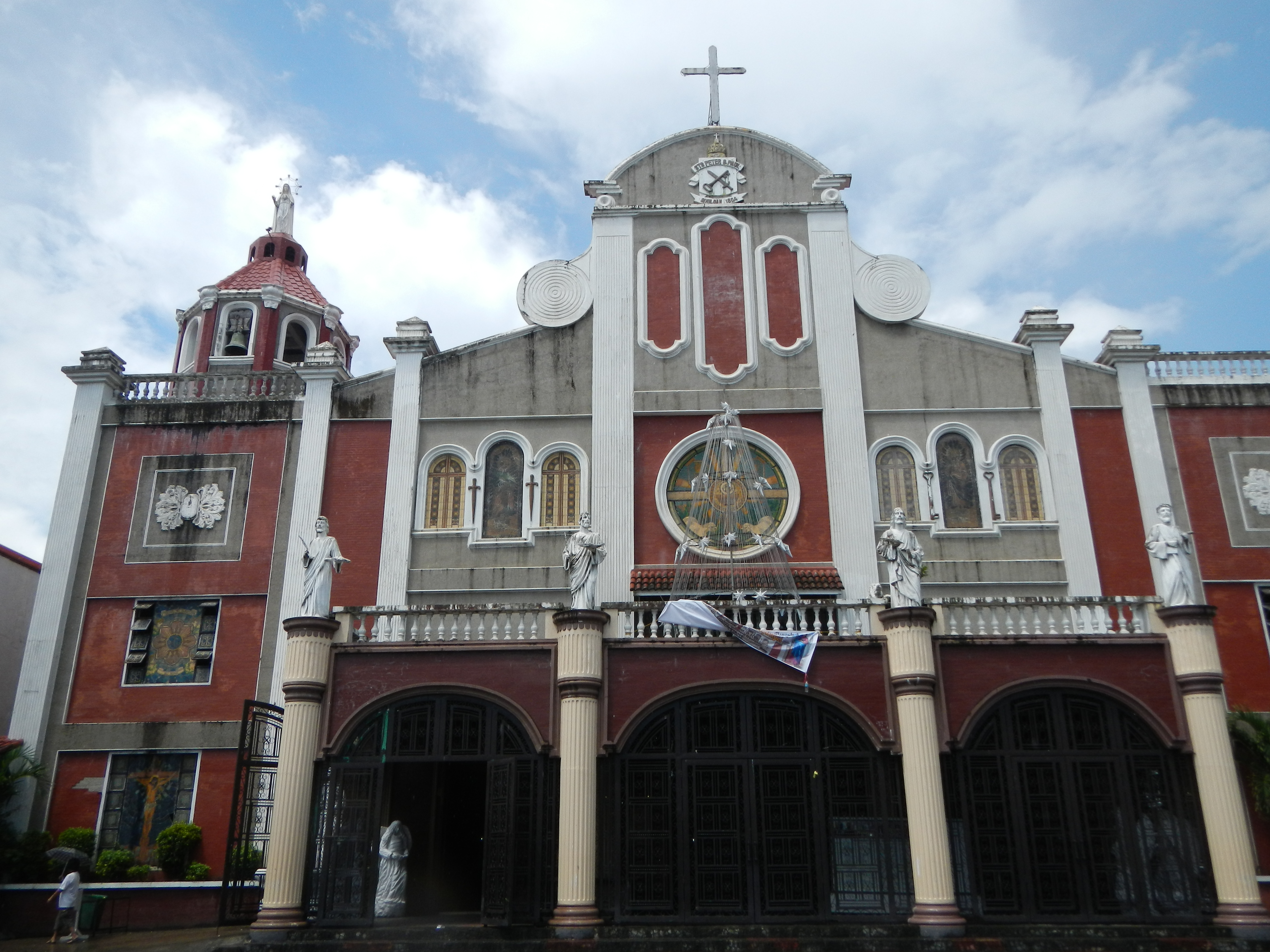
Saints Peter and Paul Parish Church

- Saints Peter and Paul Parish Church also Parroquía de San Pablo y San Pedro is the first and only Roman Catholic church in Sinilóan since 1604. Built it as stone church from 1733 to 1739 by Fr. Melchor de San Antonio, but destroyed during the 18 July 1880 earthquake. Rebuilt in 1890 to 1898 and was again damaged during the August 20, 1937 earthquake. The church was reconstructed, modernized and remodel as twice the size of the previous structure for its quadricentennial anniversary on 2004.
- Holy Cross Orthodox Church is an Orthodox Christian community located in Siniloan, Laguna. Originally established in 1980, the parish historically operated under the spiritual jurisdiction of the Orthodox Metropolitanate of Hong Kong and Southeast Asia, an exarchate of the Ecumenical Patriarchate of Constantinople. In 2020, the parish shifted its canonical affiliation and came under the jurisdiction of the Russian Orthodox Church (Moscow Patriarchate).

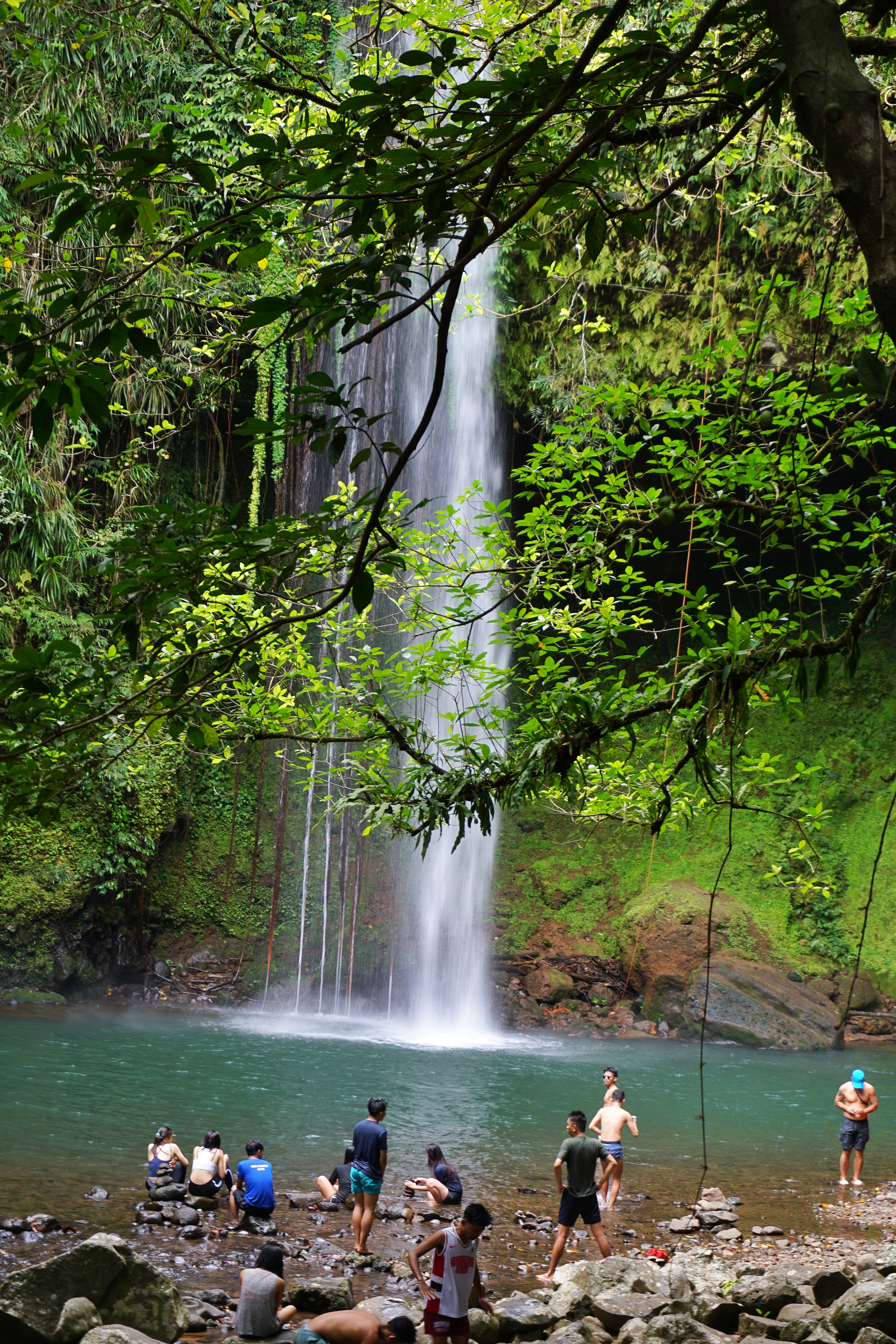

- Buruwisan Falls is a natural tourist attraction waterfall located on the slopes of Mount Romelo.

== Education ==
The Siniloan Schools District Office governs all educational institutions within the municipality. It oversees the management and operations of all private and public, from primary to secondary schools.

=== Primary and Elementary Schools ===
- Angela Ong Javier Elementary School
- Antonio Adricula Memorial Elementary School
- Bernbelle Pre-School Learning Center
- Bridgewater School
- Buhay Elementary School
- Camelean Academy
- Halayhayin Elementary School
- Solid Foundation Christian Academy
- Kapatalan Elementary School
- Kapatalan National High School
- Siniloan Elementary School

=== Secondary schools ===
- Colegio Santa Isabel of Laguna
- Gov. Felicisimo. T. San Luis National Agro-Industrial Integrated High School
- Siniloan Integrated National High School

=== Higher educational institutions ===
- Laguna State Polytechnic University
- Laguna Northwestern College San Lorenzo Ruiz Montessori Center

== Healthcare ==
Siniloan Pioneer General Hospital is the first hospital to be established in Siniloan. A Level 1 General Hospital located at L. De Leon Street, Barangay M. Acevida, it provides essential medical services to the residents of Siniloan and neighboring municipalities. The facility is complemented by the government-operated Siniloan Infirmary Hospital. It Offers general medicine, clinical chemistry, clinical microscopy, hematology, ECG, and other basic to intermediate hospital services. It also has a hemodialysis unit and maintains an active emergency and outpatient department.

== Utility services ==
Siniloan Water District (SIWADI)

First Laguna Electric Cooperative, Inc. (FLECO)

== Notable personalities ==
- Celso Adolfo Castillo – film director and screenwriter.
- Yllana Marie Aduana – Miss Philippines Earth 2023, Miss Earth Air 2023
- Dion Ignacio - actor and musician
