= 1982 Pacific hurricane season =

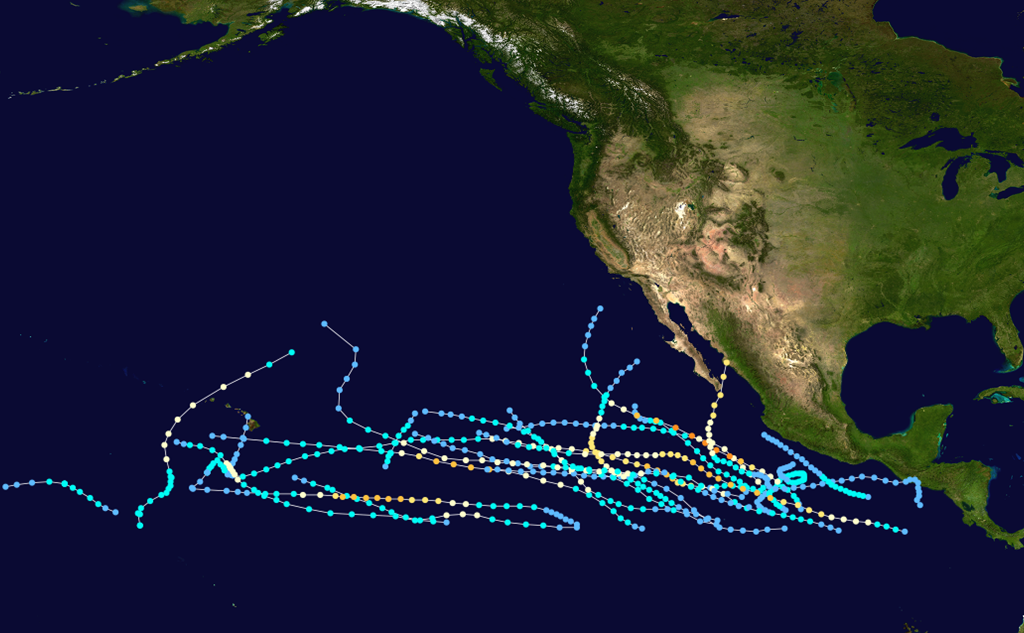
- Season summary map

Seasonal boundaries
- First system formed: May 20, 1982
- Last system dissipated: November 25, 1982

Strongest storm
- Name: Olivia
  - Maximum winds: 145 mph (230 km/h) (1-minute sustained)

Seasonal statistics
- Total depressions: 30
- Total storms: 23
- Hurricanes: 12
- Major hurricanes (Cat. 3+): 5
- Total fatalities: 1,632 total
- Total damage: $1.31 billion (1982 USD)

Related articles
- 1982 Atlantic hurricane season; 1982 Pacific typhoon season; 1982 North Indian Ocean cyclone season

The 1982 Pacific hurricane season was, at the time, the most active and costliest Pacific hurricane season on record, with 23 named storms. Of those, 12 became hurricanes, with 5 intensifying into major hurricanes (Category 3 or above on the Saffir–Simpson scale). The season officially started on May 15 in the eastern Pacific basin and June 1 in the central Pacific basin. The season in both basins ended on November 30. These dates conventionally delimit the period during which most tropical cyclones form in these regions of the Pacific Ocean. The first tropical cyclone of the season, Tropical Storm Aletta, formed on May 20, and the final one of the season, Hurricane Iwa, dissipated on November 25. A strengthening El Niño that year fueled the season's above normal activity.

The strongest system of the season was Hurricane Olivia, which reached peak intensity on September 21, with maximum sustained winds of 145 mph (230 km/h). Its remnants brought heavy rain to a wide swath of the Western United States. Hurricane Paul, the deadliest system, developed as a tropical depression just offshore Central America on September 18, briefly moved inland two days later, then turned, and headed westward out to sea. Paul was responsible for 1,625 fatalities, most of them in El Salvador, and $520 million (1982 USD) in damage. Hurricanes Daniel and Gilma both briefly threatened Hawaii, while Iwa caused heavy damage on Kauai and Niihau.

== Seasonal summary ==
List of costliest Pacific hurricane seasons
| Rank | Cost | Season |
|---|---|---|
| 1 | ≥$13.1 billion | 2023 |
| 2 | $4.47 billion | 2013 |
| 3 | ≥$3.15 billion | 1992 |
| 4 | $2.46 billion | 2024 |
| 5 | ≥$2.09 billion | 2014 |
| 6 | ≥$1.64 billion | 2018 |
| 7 | $1.62 billion | 2010 |
| 8 | $1.31 billion | 1982 |
| 9 | $850 million | 1998 |
| 10 | $816.33 million | 1983 |

During the 1982 Pacific hurricane season, a total of 23 named storms formed. Tropical cyclogenesis began in the Eastern Pacific basin (east of 140°W) on May 20 with the formation of tropical storm Aletta, and ended on October 26 with the dissipation of Tropical Storm Tara. Within the basin, 19 named storms formed, 32% above the 16‑year (1966‑82) average of 14.4. Of those, 11 reached hurricane strength, 49% above the average of 5.5 during the same period. Six systems crossed into the Central Pacific Hurricane Center's area of responsibility (between 140°W and the International Date Line) in 1982, three times as many as did so in the previous season; Hurricane Daniel was the first to do so, on July 16. A then‑record four named storms formed in the Central Pacific basin in 1982. The first, Tropical Storm Akoni, formed on August 30, and the last, season, Hurricane Iwa, dissipated on November 25.

A strengthening El Niño in 1982 fueled the season's above normal activity, warming sea surface temperatures across the equatorial Central Pacific nearly 5 °F (2.8 °C) above normal. Its effects included the large numbers of central Pacific systems, among them Iwa, the strongest hurricane on record, up to that time to traverse the Hawaiian Islands, and the ability for five eastern Pacific systems to reach major hurricane strength. Iwa caused $312 million (1982 USD) in damage in Hawaii, and was directly responsible for one fatality there. Reports of damage and casualties in Central America and Mexico during the season were mostly in conjunction with hurricanes Olivia and Paul. Paul, the only Pacific hurricane to make landfall during the season, was a particularly deadly and destructive system. It was responsible for the deaths of 1,625 people and for causing $520 million in damage, mostly in Central America. The remnants of Olivia and Paul, along with those of Hurricane Norman, produced scattered rainfall over the Southwestern United States.

== Systems ==
=== Tropical Storm Aletta ===
- Tropical storm (SSHWS)
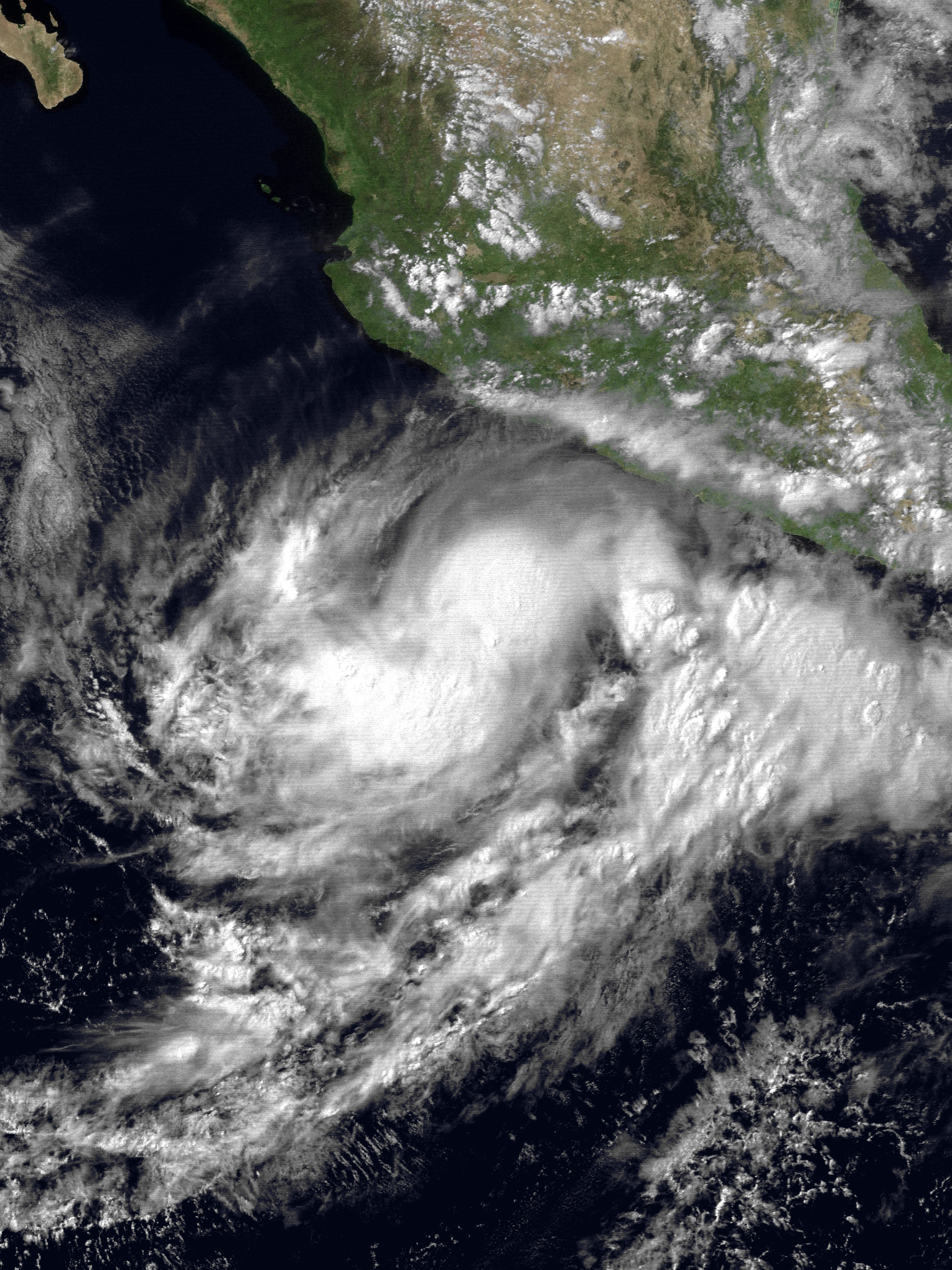
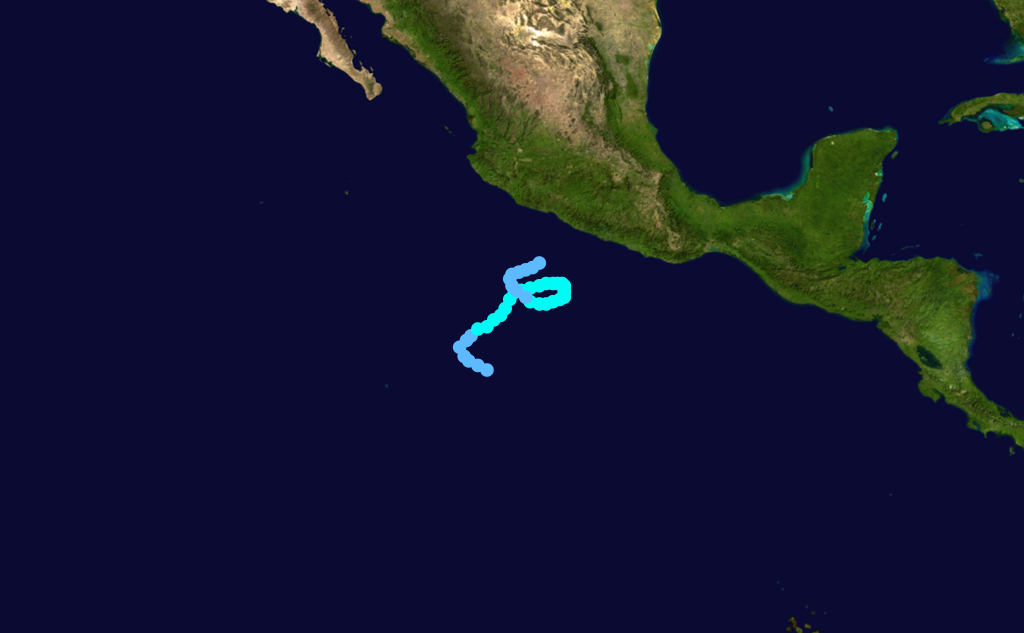
- Duration: May 20 – May 29
- Peak intensity: 65 mph (100 km/h) (1-min);

The origins of Aletta are from a tropical disturbance that was first noted on May 18 about 500 mi (805 km) south-southwest of Acapulco. On May 20, the disturbance was upgraded into a tropical depression. Moving northwest, the depression became Tropical Storm Aletta 36 hours later. The system re-curved towards the northeast due to strong upper-level westerlies, reaching its peak intensity of 65 mph (105 km/h) on May 23. Shortly after its peak, Tropical Storm Aletta began to weaken. However, the system briefly leveled off in intensity for 30 hours before resuming a weakening trend. On May 25, Aletta slowed and moved in a large clockwise loop until May 28. Shortly thereafter, Tropical Storm Aletta was downgraded into a depression. Tropical Depression Aletta dissipated on May 29 roughly 180 mi (290 km/h) southwest of Acapulco.

=== Tropical Depression Two-E ===
- Tropical depression (SSHWS)
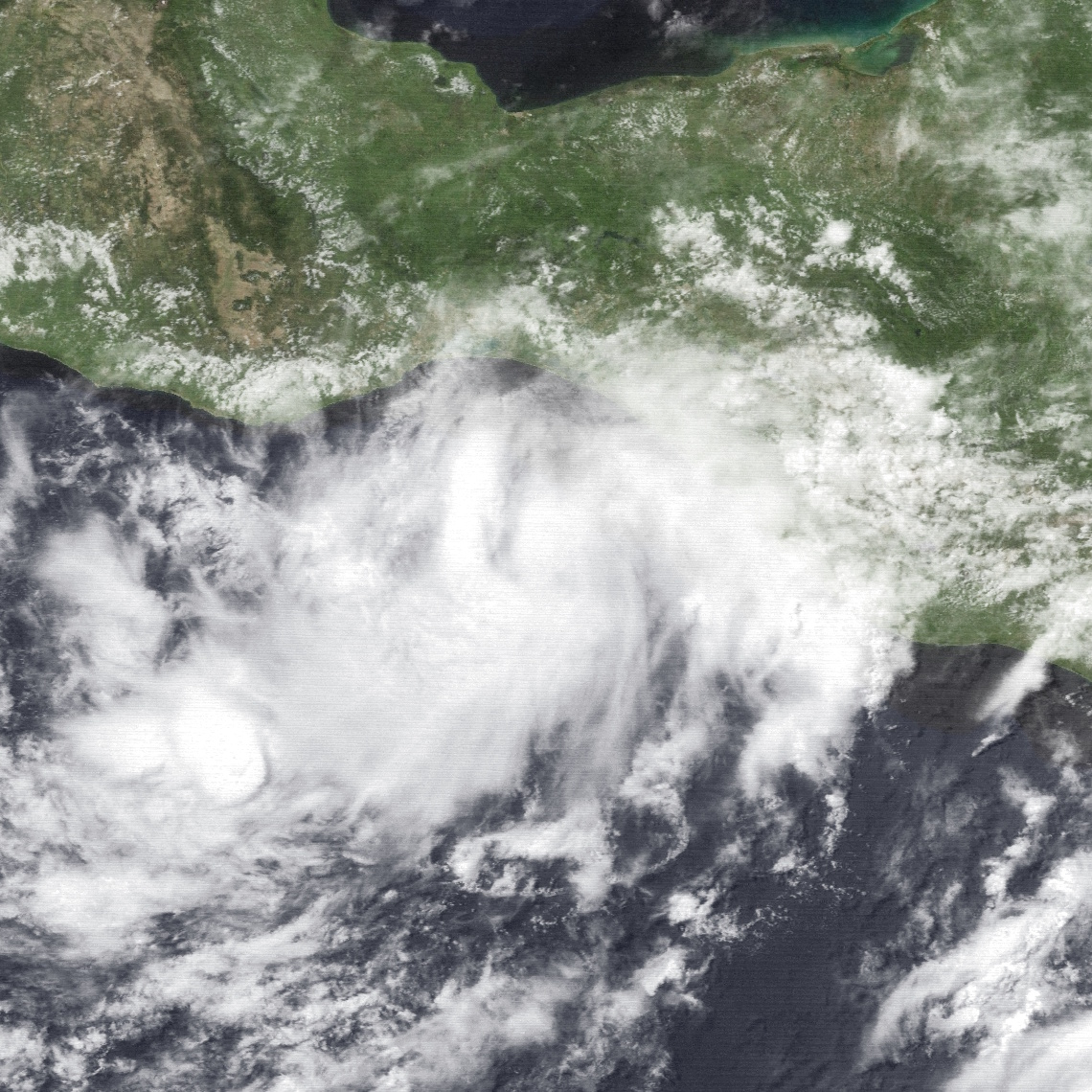
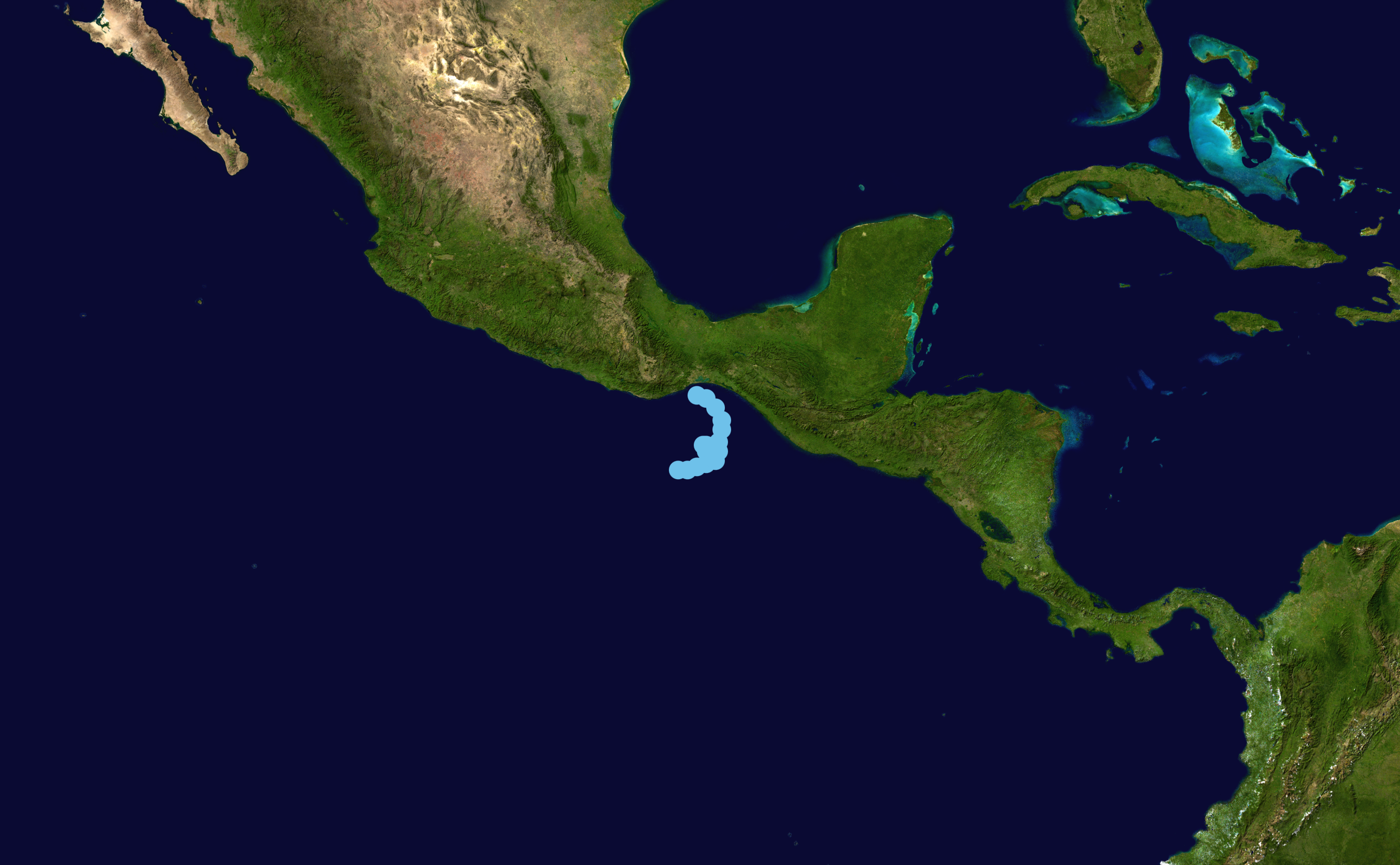
- Duration: May 31 – June 4
- Peak intensity: 35 mph (55 km/h) (1-min);

This system originated as a low in the western Caribbean on the morning of May 27. The next day it moved southwest into Guatemala with significant thunderstorm activity, emerging into the Gulf of Tehuantepec around noon on May 29. By May 31, it was organized enough to be considered a tropical depression. Slowly weakening on June 1 as it remained quasi-stationary, the system dissipated in the Gulf of Tehuantepec on June 4.

=== Tropical Depression Three-E ===
- Tropical depression (SSHWS)
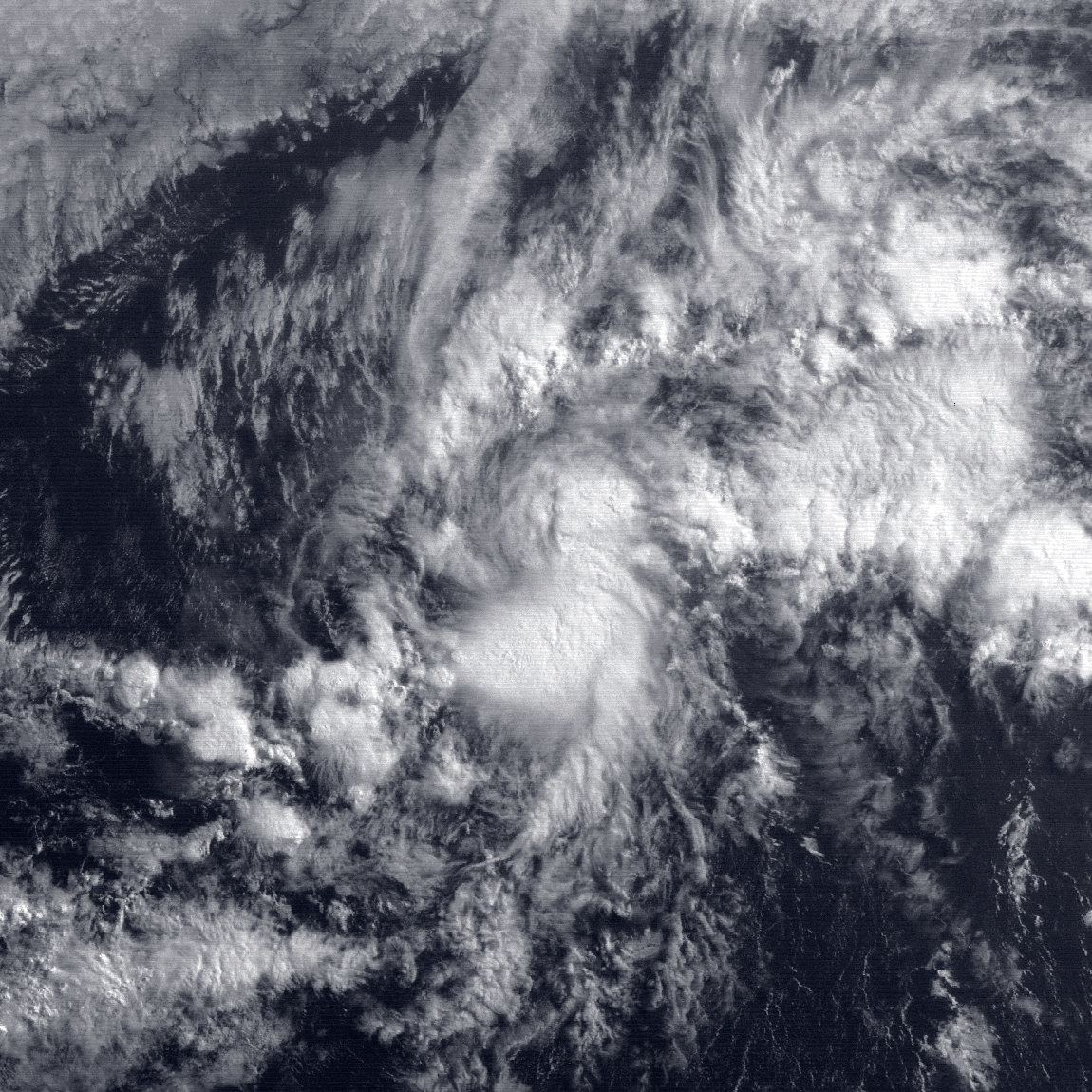
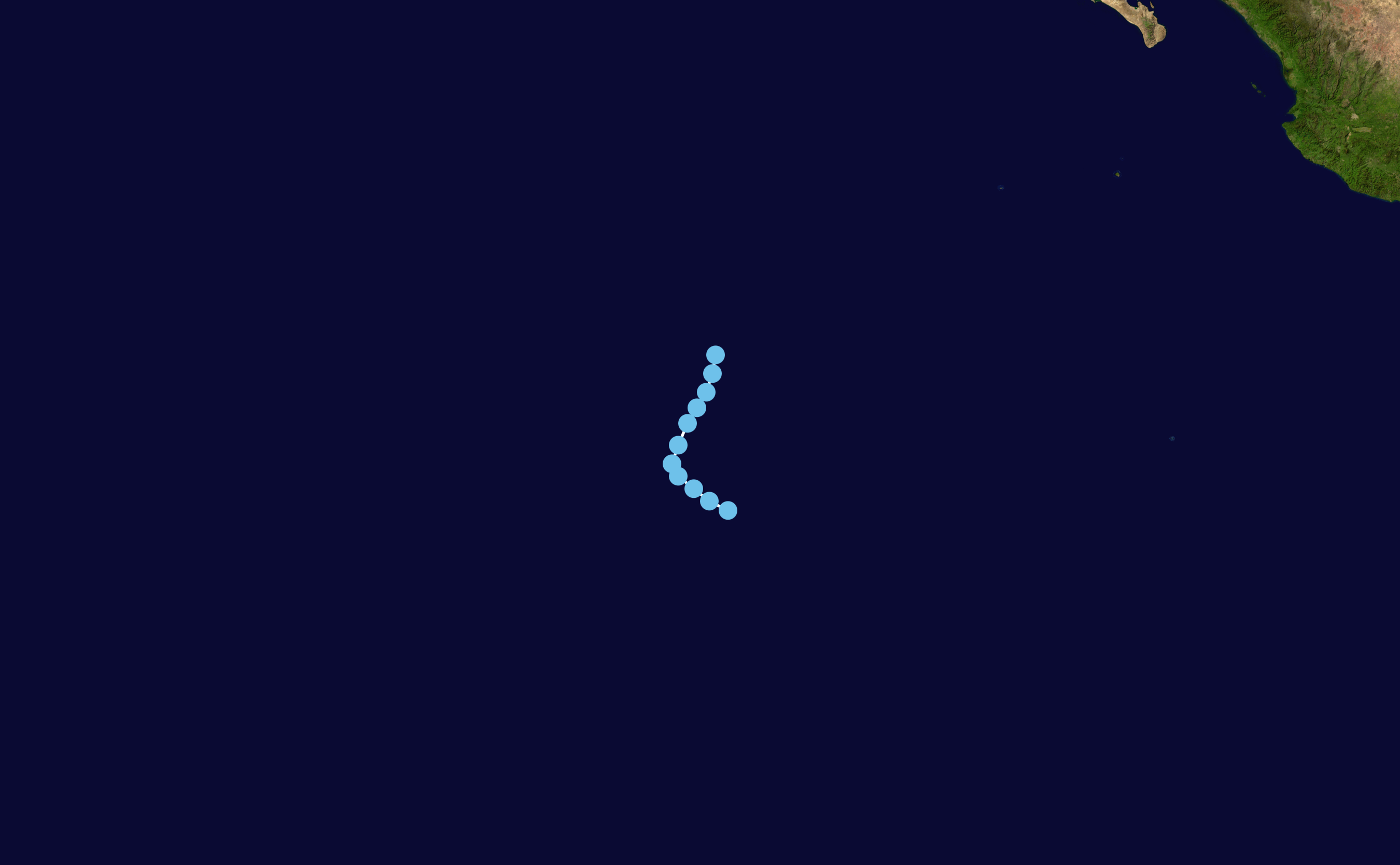
- Duration: June 13 – June 15
- Peak intensity: 30 mph (45 km/h) (1-min);

This cyclone formed well to the west-southwest of Mexico on June 12. The depression slowly recurved due to an upper-level low located well to its north-northwest. By June 15, vertical wind shear had taken its toll and the system dissipated about 300 mi (485 km) north of where it formed.

=== Tropical Storm Bud ===
- Tropical storm (SSHWS)
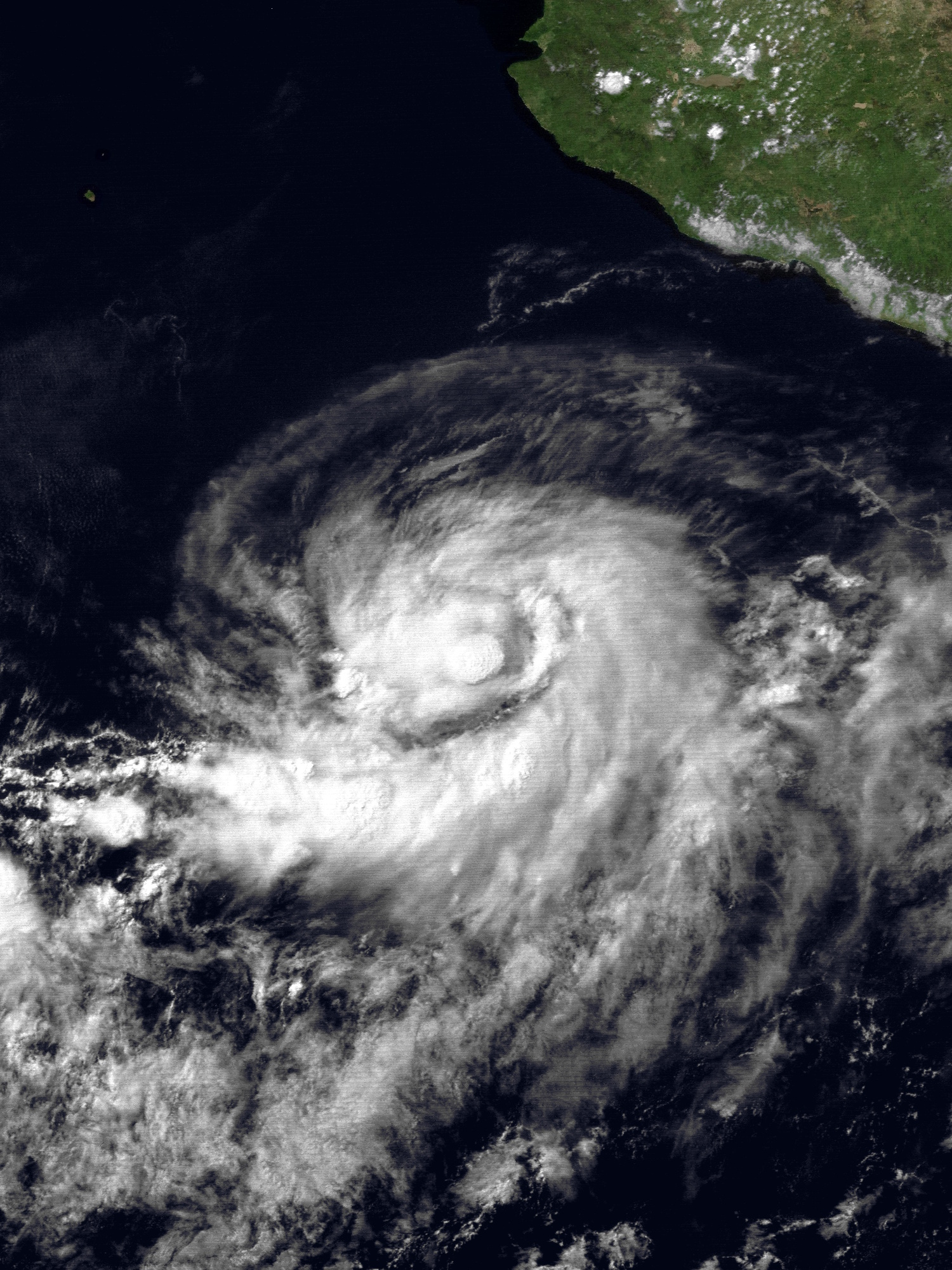
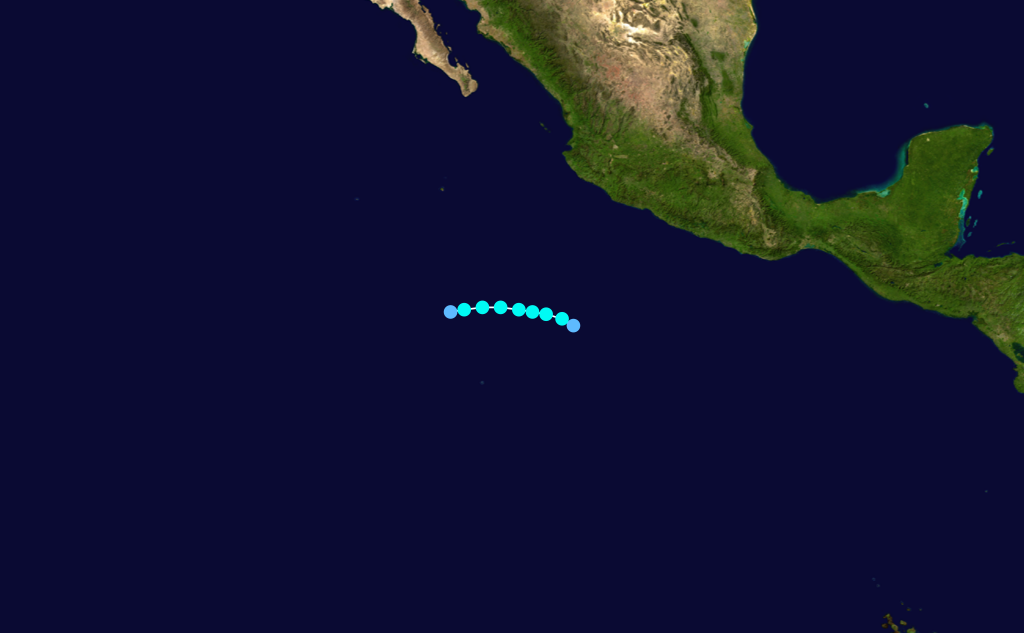
- Duration: June 15 – June 17
- Peak intensity: 50 mph (85 km/h) (1-min);

On June 15, this cyclone formed about 460 mi (740 km) southwest of Acapulco. Drifting west-northwest, it quickly strengthened into a tropical storm. Maximum sustained winds peaked near 50 mph (80 km/h) late on June 15. Turning south of due west, vertical wind shear weakened Bud, with the cyclone dissipating by the morning of June 17 about 23 miles (37 km) north-northwest of Clipperton Island.

=== Tropical Depression Five-E ===
- Tropical depression (SSHWS)
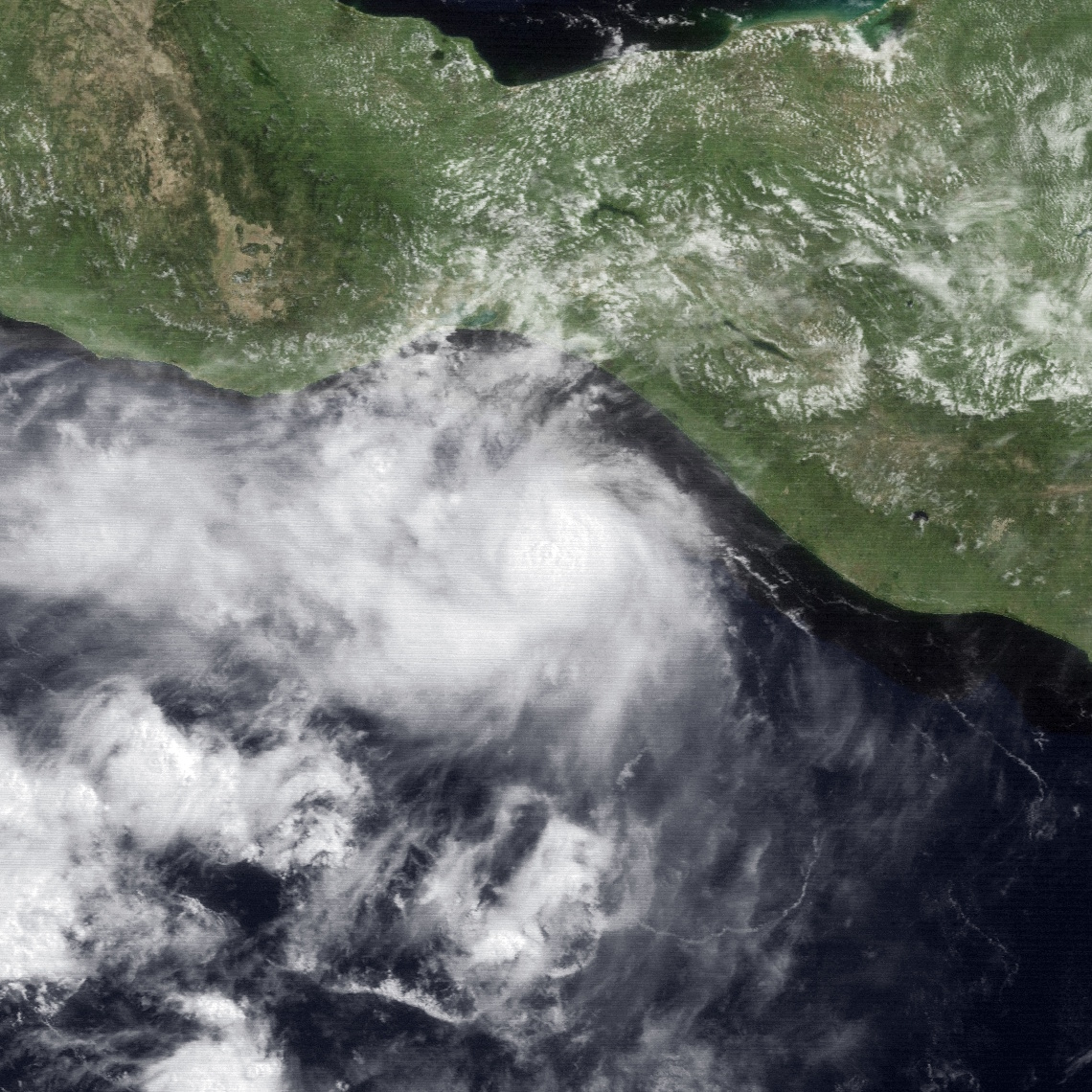
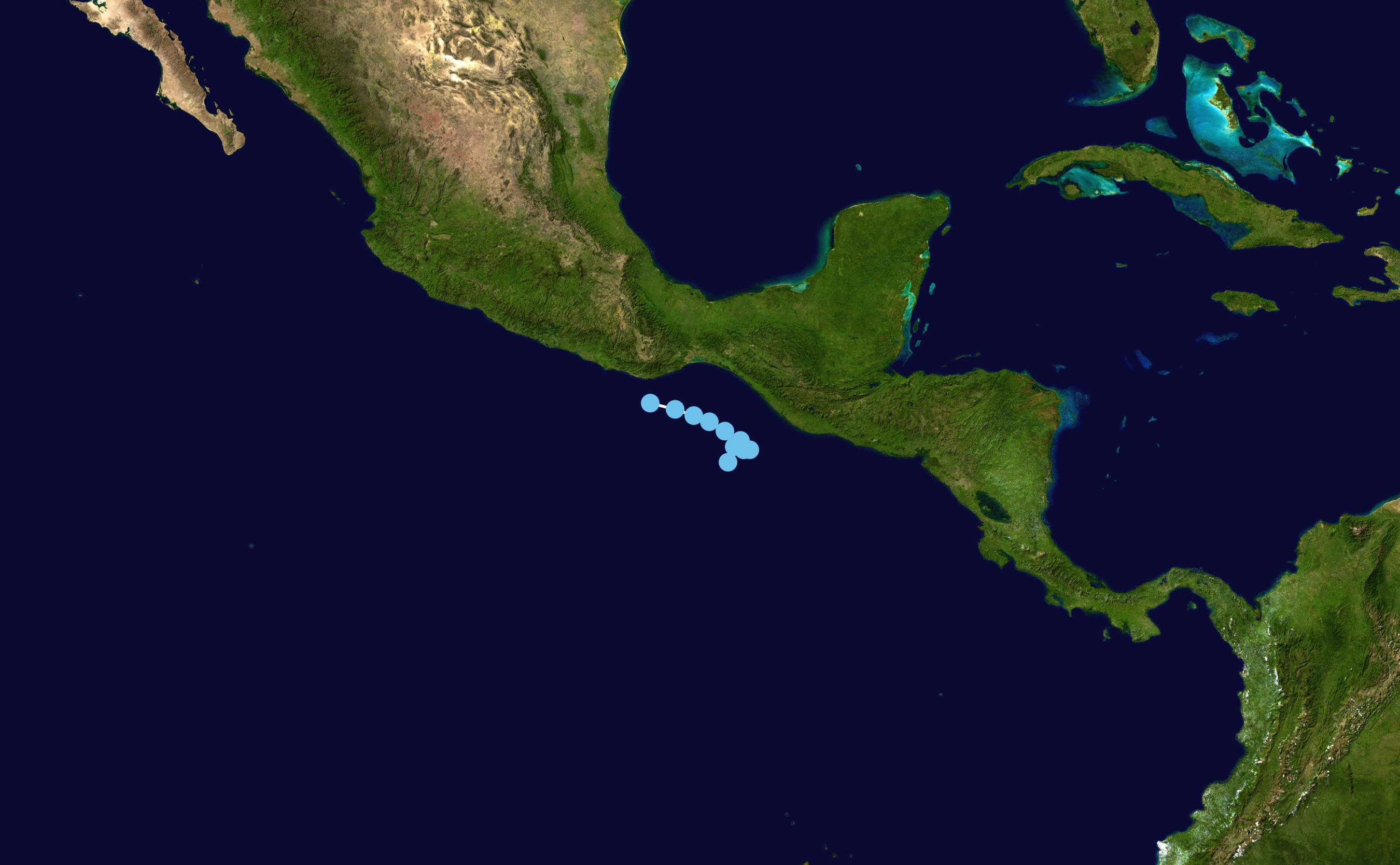
- Duration: June 17 – June 19
- Peak intensity: 35 mph (55 km/h) (1-min);

Late on June 16, deep convection organized in the Gulf of Tehuantepec into a tropical depression. Transcribing a small clockwise loop, the system moved west-northwest. Interaction with Mexico likely played a role in its weakening as water temperatures under the system were never below 82 °F (28 °C). The system dissipated about 90 mi (145 km) south of Puerto Ángel by the morning of June 19.

=== Tropical Storm Carlotta ===
- Tropical storm (SSHWS)
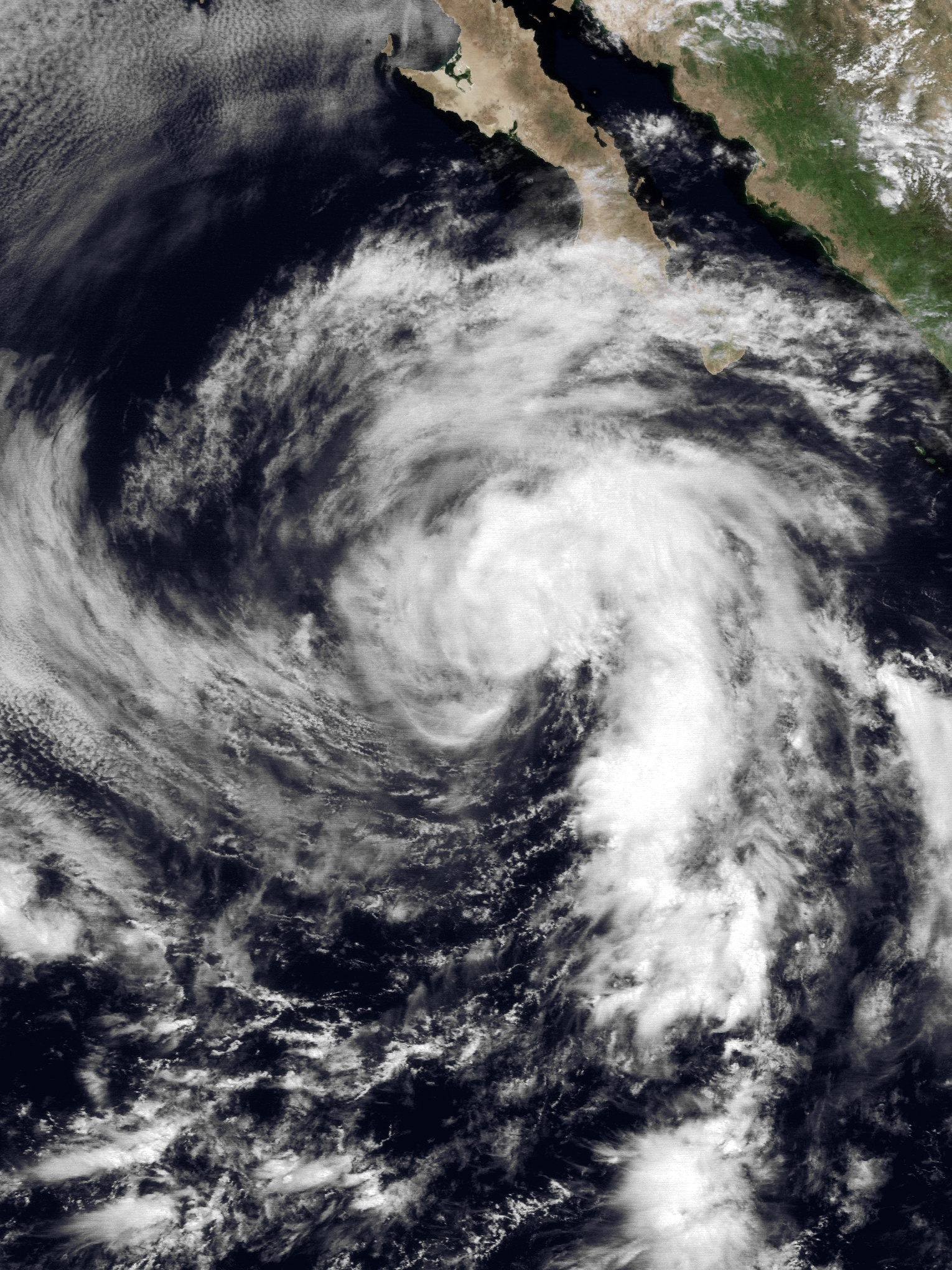
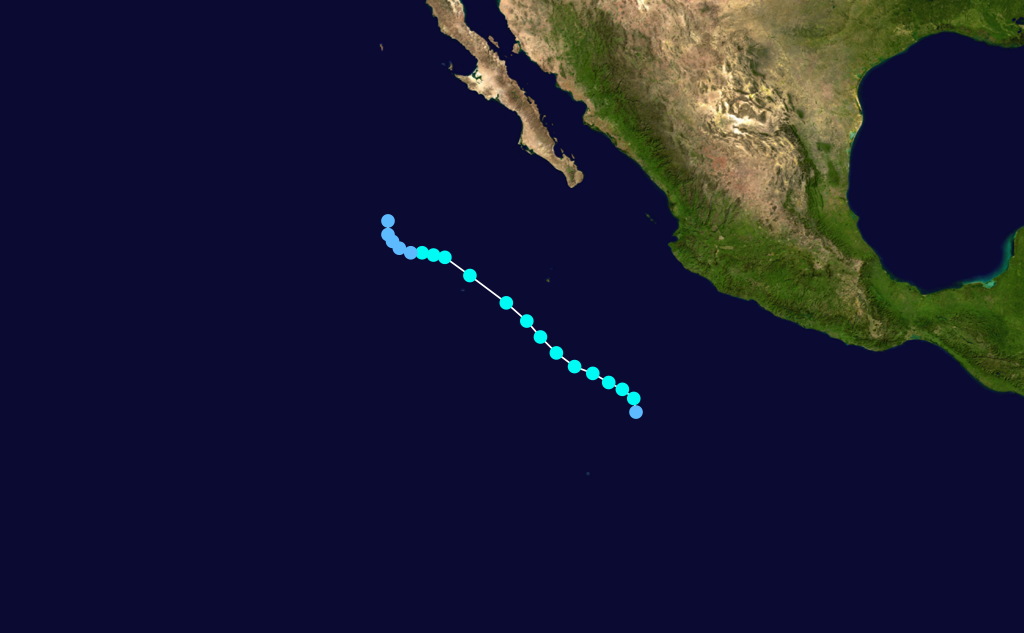
- Duration: July 1 – July 6
- Peak intensity: 60 mph (95 km/h) (1-min);

A tropical wave crossed Central America on June 26, creating an area of thunderstorms just inside the tropical eastern Pacific that morning. Cyclonic turning was evident by the night of June 30 while located roughly 350 mi (565 km) south of Manzanillo as the system continued westward. Slowly turning northwest, the system was upgraded to a tropical depression early on July 1 and a tropical storm by nightfall. Maximum sustained winds increased to 60 mph (95 km/h) by noon July 3. Increasingly southwest flow aloft turned Carlotta more northward into cooler waters, causing the cyclone to regain tropical depression status on the evening of July 4, ultimately dissipating southwest of Cabo San Lucas the next evening.

=== Tropical Depression Seven-E ===
- Tropical depression (SSHWS)
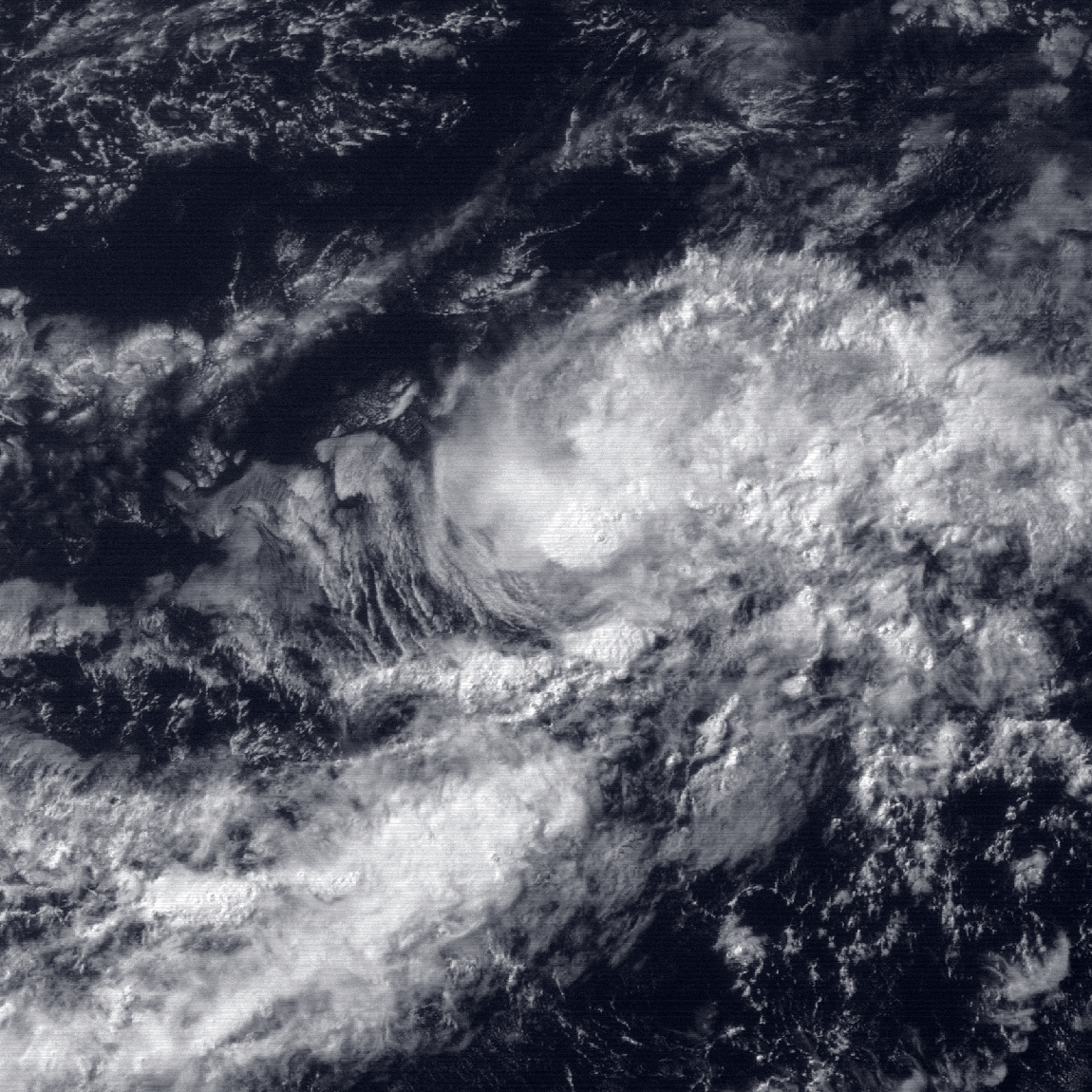
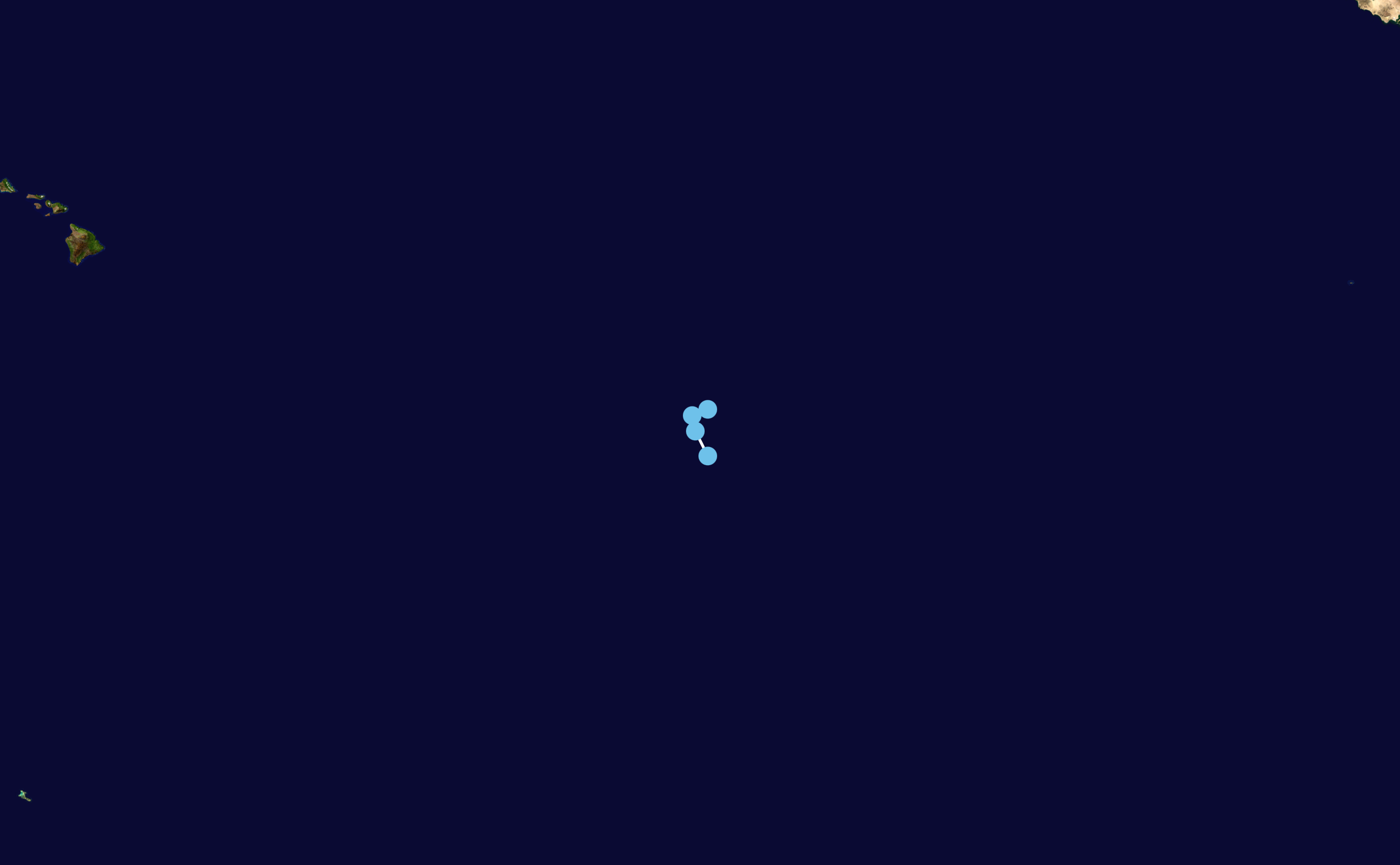
- Duration: July 3 – July 3
- Peak intensity: 35 mph (55 km/h) (1-min);

The system formed between Tropical Storm Carlotta and the Hawaiian Islands on the evening of July 2. Slowly recurving north and northeast, the system moved into cooler waters and dissipated about 100 miles (160 km) north of where it formed by the afternoon of July 3.

=== Hurricane Daniel ===
- Category 3 hurricane (SSHWS)
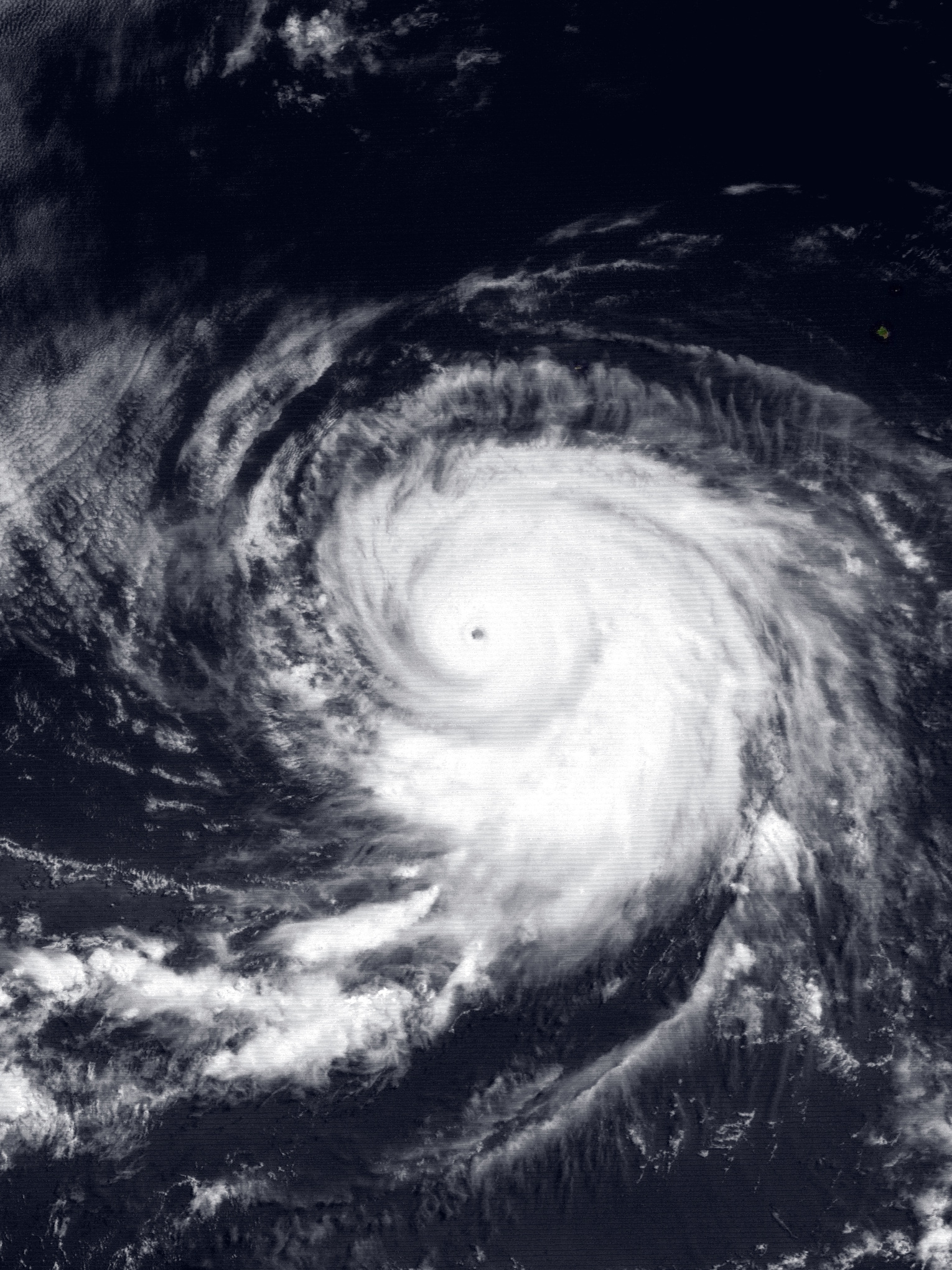
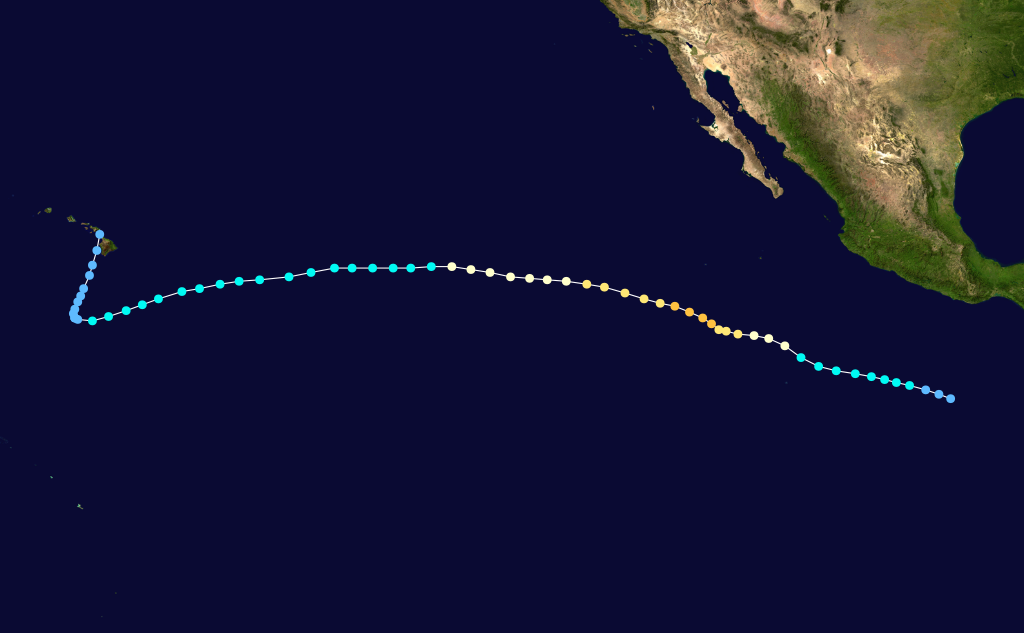
- Duration: July 7 – July 22
- Peak intensity: 115 mph (185 km/h) (1-min);

Tropical Depression Eight-E formed south of Mexico on July 7. Moving west-northwest, the cyclone slowly strengthened into a tropical storm around noon on July 8 before becoming a hurricane late in the afternoon of July 9. Daniel reached its maximum intensity of 115 mph (185 km/h) early in the morning of July 11 a few hundred miles southwest of Manzanillo, Mexico. As the storm moved westward, it slowly weakened. Daniel regained tropical storm status during the night of July 14, entering the Central Pacific Basin as a weakening tropical storm on the morning of July 16. Daniel retained tropical storm intensity for the next few days before weakening into a tropical depression about 280 mi (450 km) south southwest of the Big Island of Hawaii, being sheared by the same upper trough that caused Emilia's dissipation a few days earlier. Daniel turned northward, and on July 22, dissipated in the Alenuihaha Channel between Maui and the Big Island of Hawaii.

=== Tropical Storm Emilia ===
- Tropical storm (SSHWS)
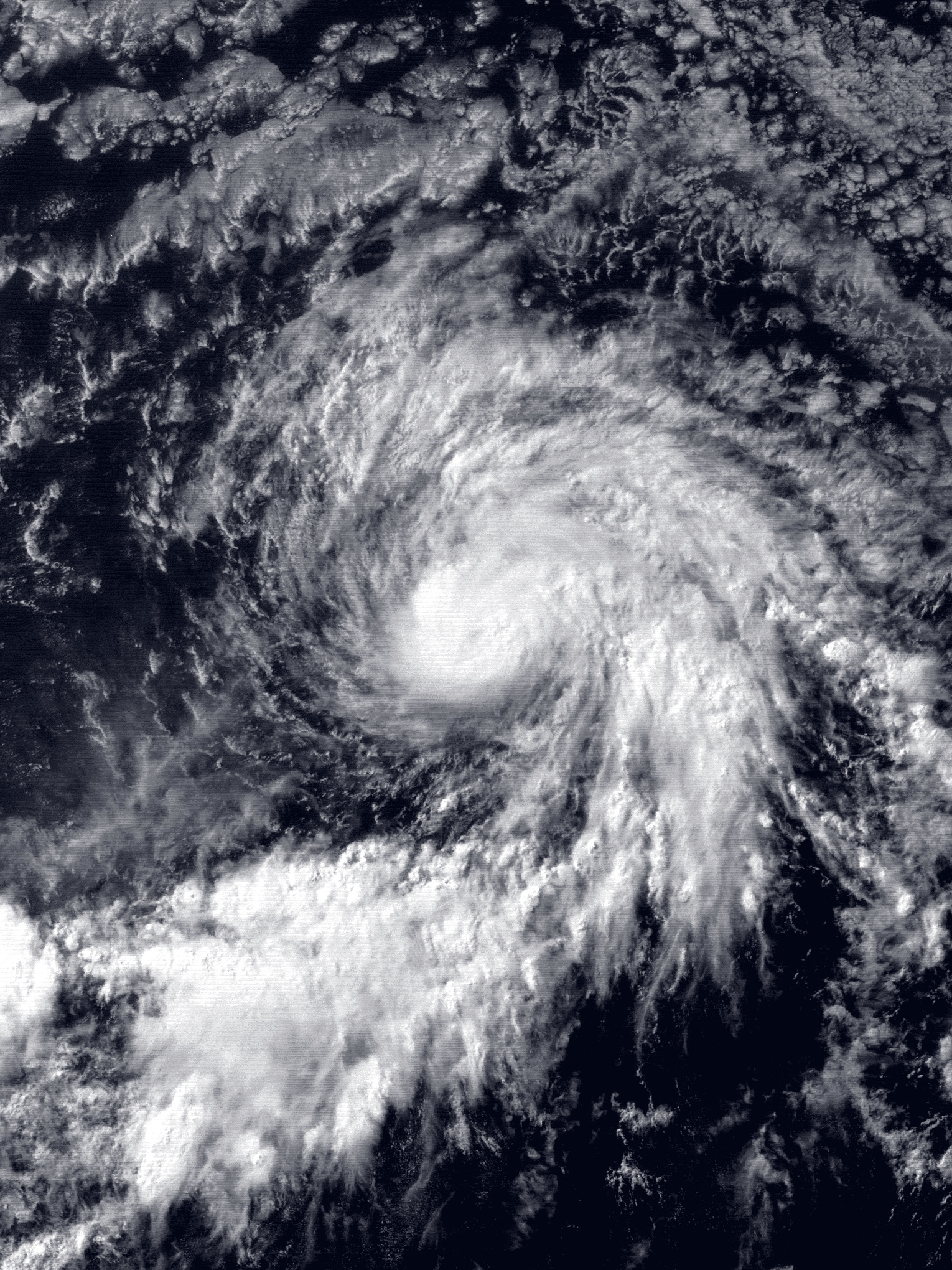
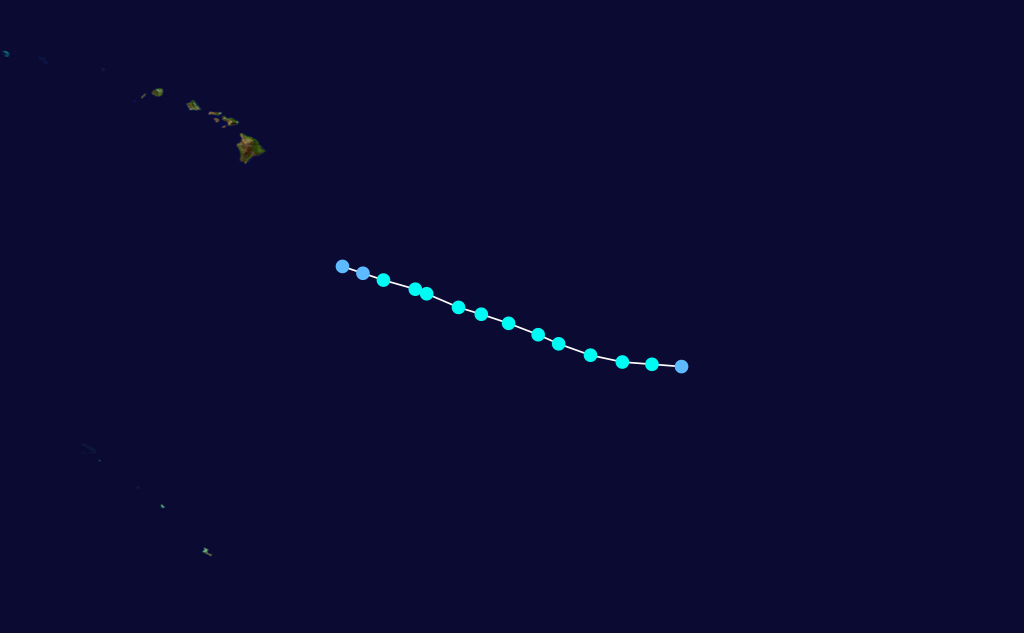
- Duration: July 12 – July 15
- Peak intensity: 65 mph (100 km/h) (1-min);

Tropical Depression Nine-E developed near 10.0° N 136.5° W on the morning of July 12. Intensifying, the cyclone became a tropical storm later that day. Emilia moved westward around 13 miles per hour (21 km/h) and entered the Central Pacific Basin on the night of July 12. Over the next day, the storm moved west-northwest, reaching maximum sustained winds of 65 mph (105 km/h). An upper trough to the west weakened Emilia rapidly due to vertical wind shear, and the cyclone weakened to tropical depression status early on the morning of July 15. Dissipation of the tropical depression was noted by afternoon.

=== Tropical Depression Ten-E ===
- Tropical depression (SSHWS)
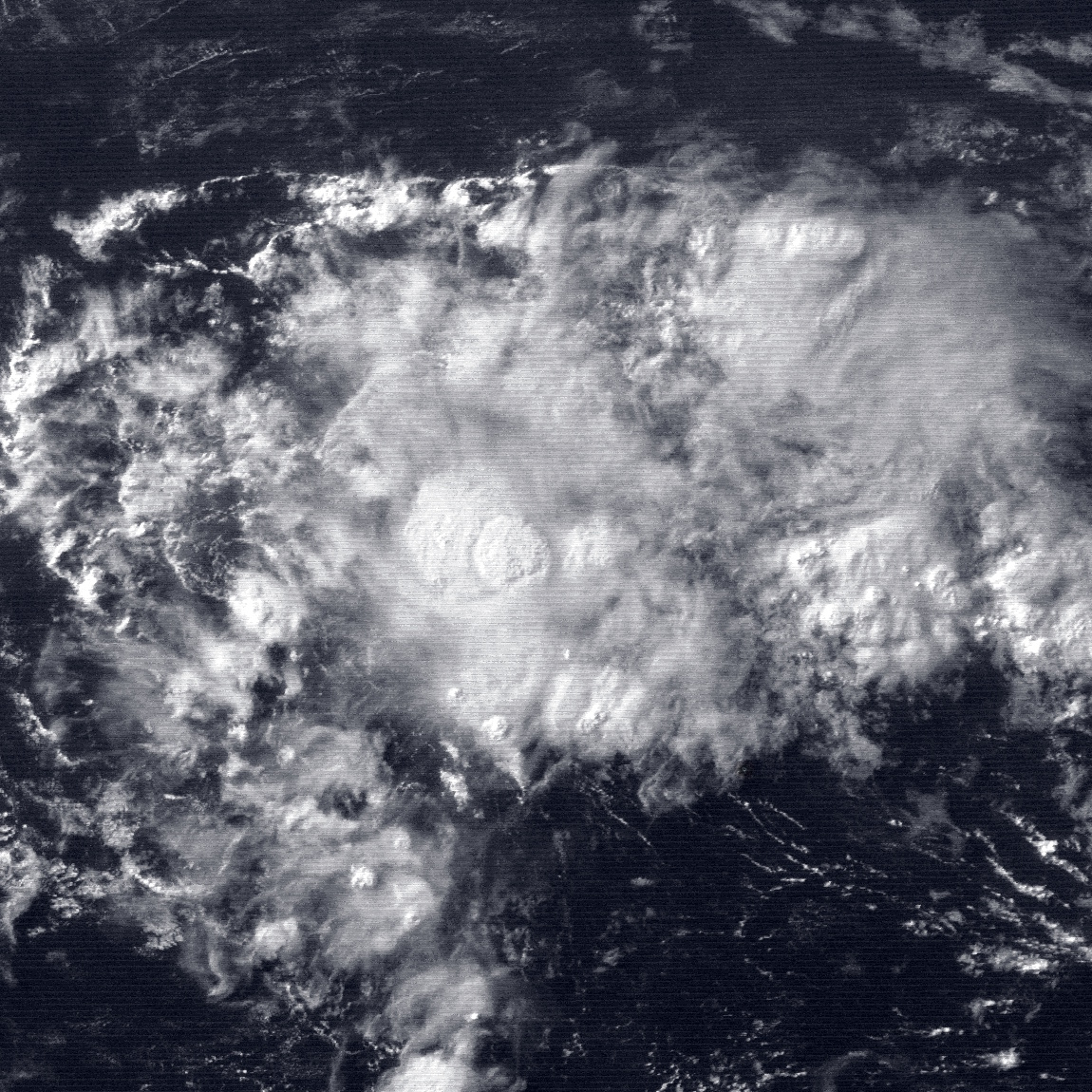
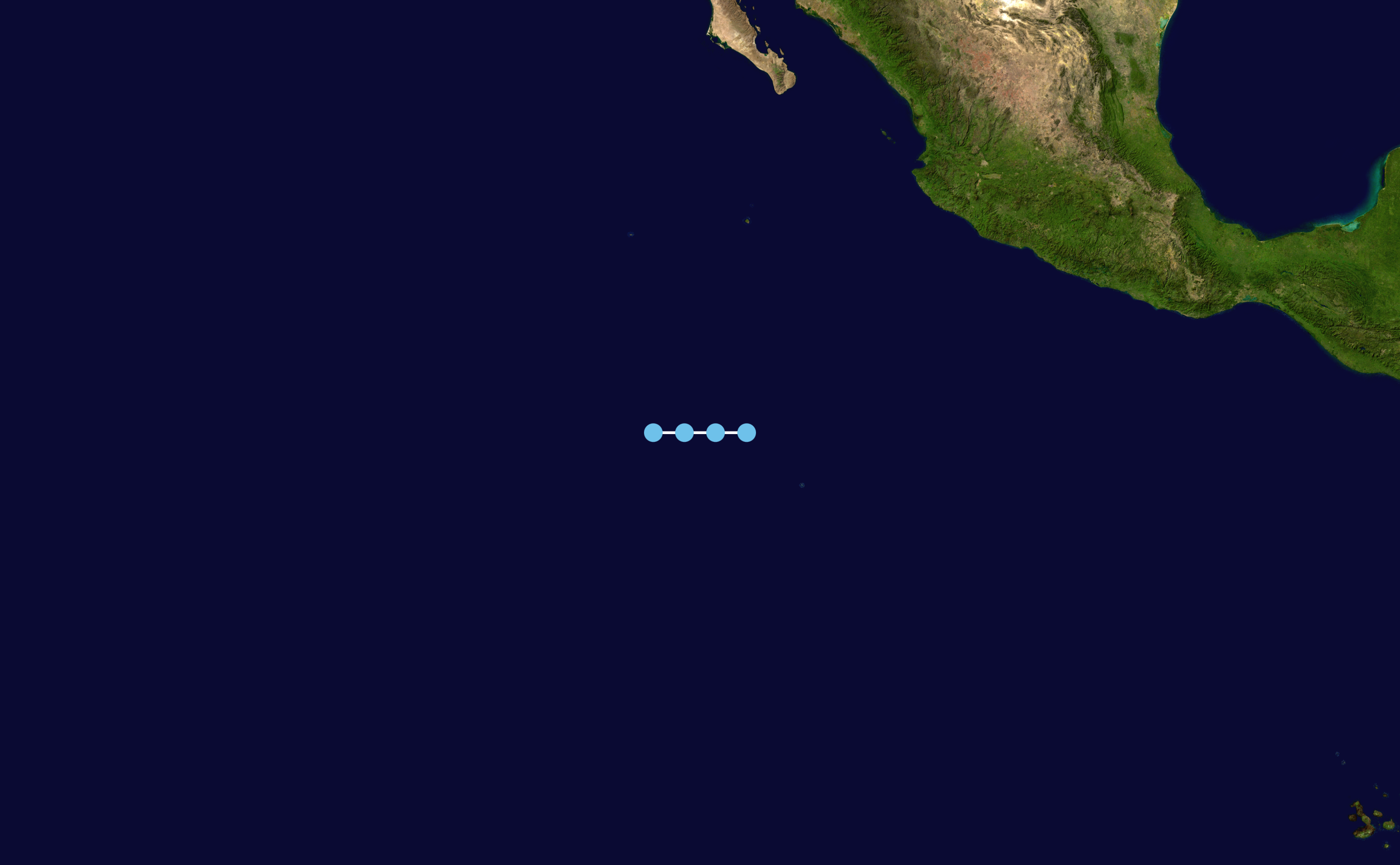
- Duration: July 13 – July 14
- Peak intensity: 35 mph (55 km/h) (1-min);

To the east of Daniel, a tropical depression formed on the evening of July 13 a few hundred miles west-southwest of Manzanillo. The system moved westward and weakened thereafter, dissipating about 200 mi (320 km) west of where it had formed by the afternoon of July 14.

=== Tropical Depression Eleven-E ===
- Tropical depression (SSHWS)
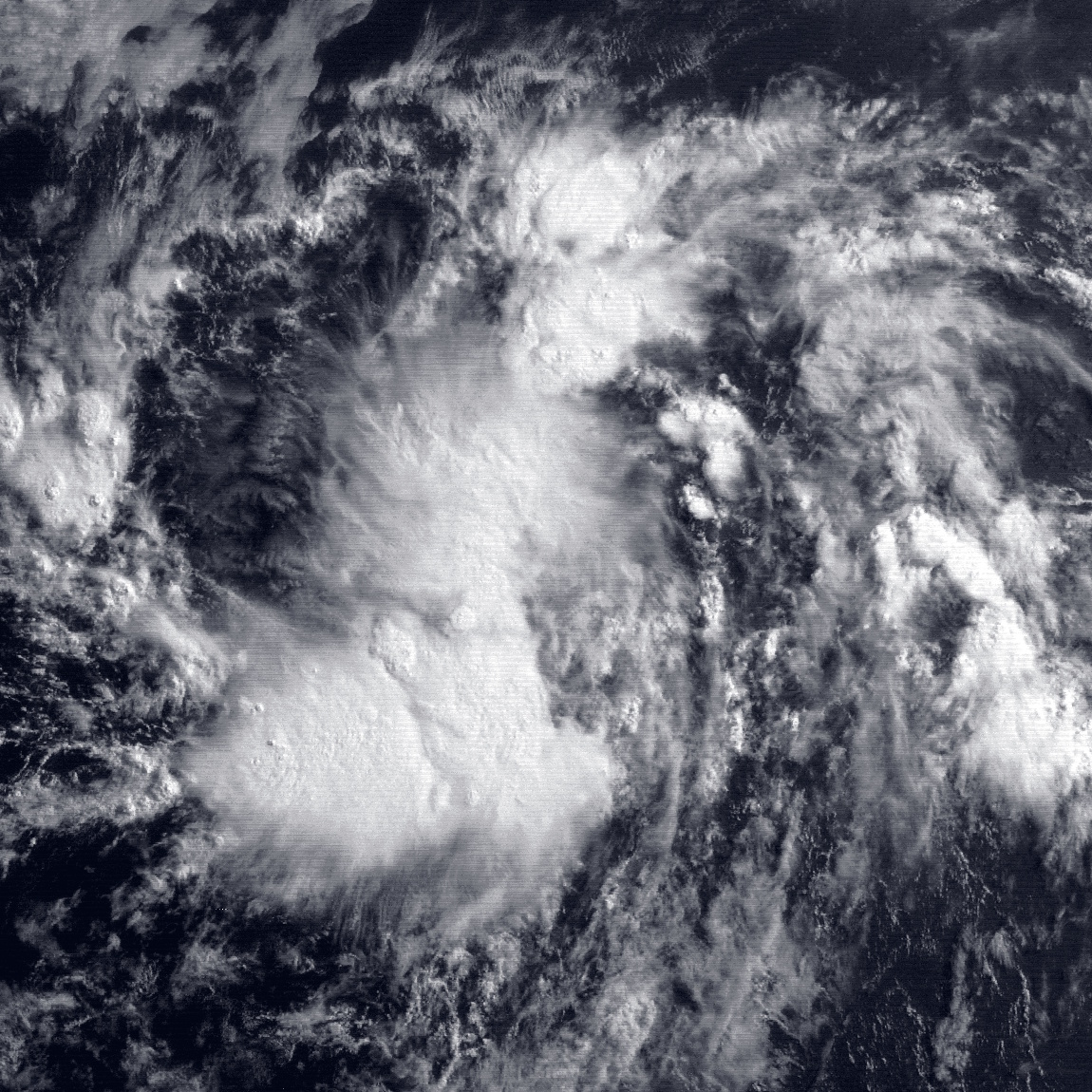
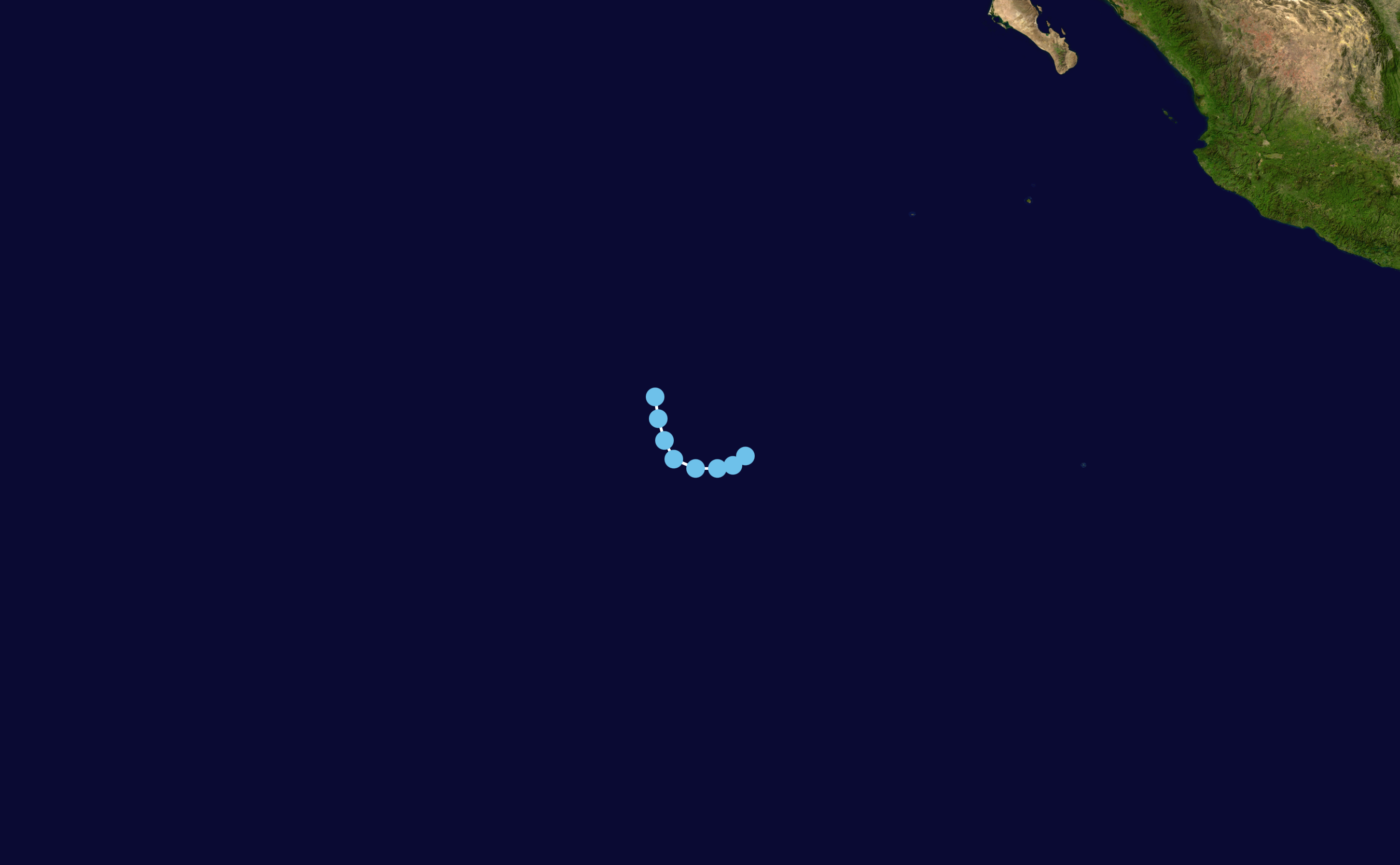
- Duration: July 15 – July 17
- Peak intensity: 35 mph (55 km/h) (1-min);

A tropical disturbance was spotted about 650 mi (1,045 km) southwest of Acapulco on July 12. By the evening of July 15, cyclonic turning was evident and the system was upgraded to a tropical depression. Moving unsteadily to the west-northwest, the system weakened, dissipating a few hundred miles west-northwest of where it had formed.

=== Hurricane Fabio ===
- Category 1 hurricane (SSHWS)
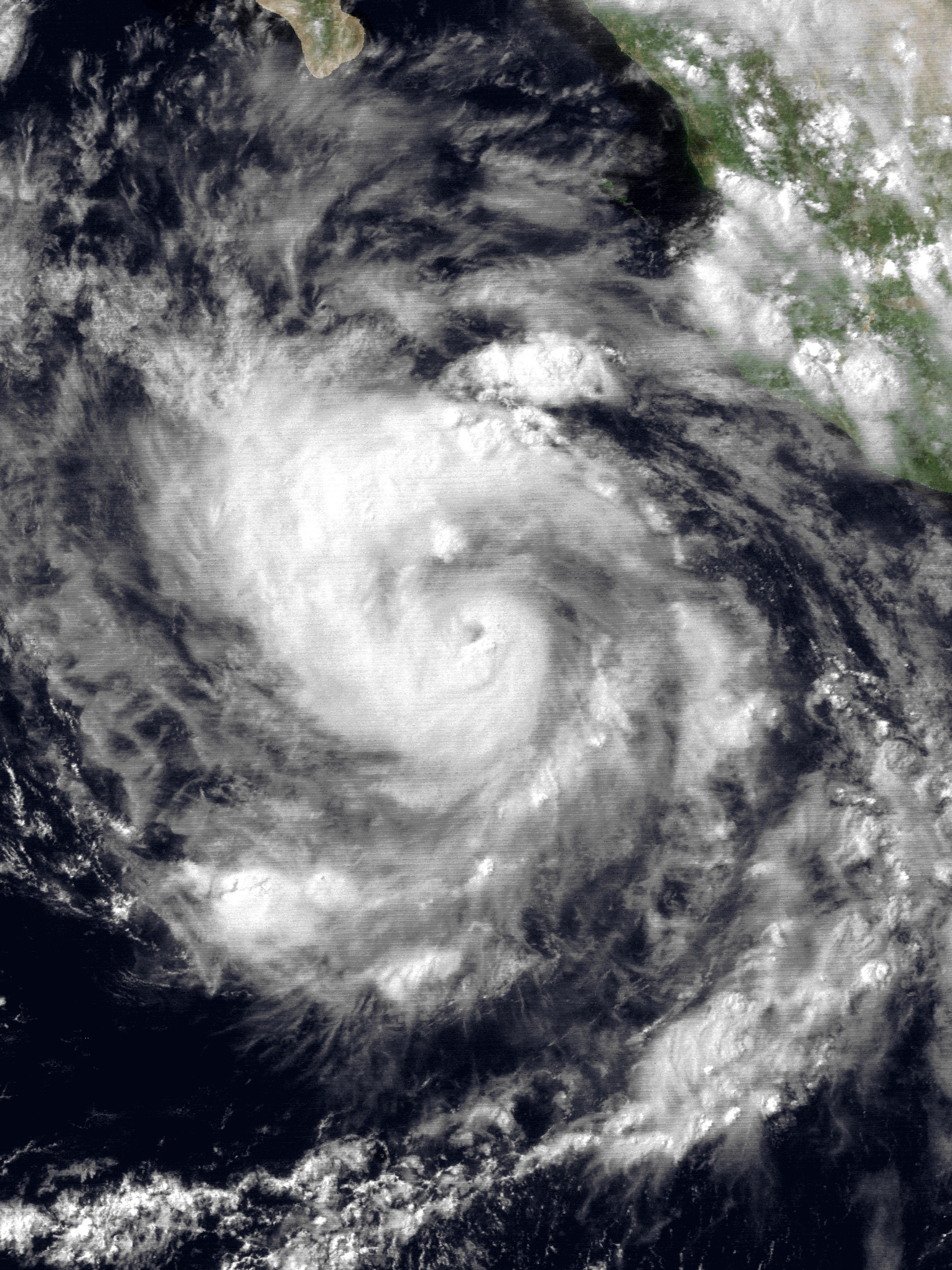
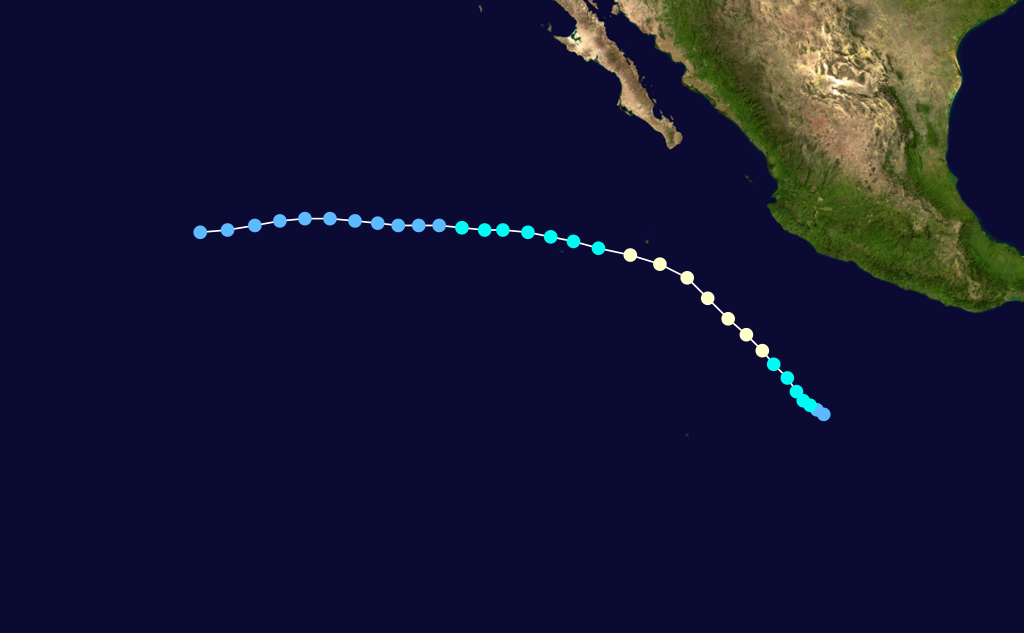
- Duration: July 17 – July 25
- Peak intensity: 80 mph (130 km/h) (1-min);

The cyclone developed as a tropical depression southeast of Manzanillo on July 17. Over the next couple of days, it strengthened rapidly into a hurricane as it moved northwest, peaking in intensity with 75 mph (120 km/h) winds. Gradual weakening occurred as Fabio turned westward along the 19th parallel north into cooler waters, eventually dissipating late on July 24.

=== Hurricane Gilma ===
- Category 3 hurricane (SSHWS)
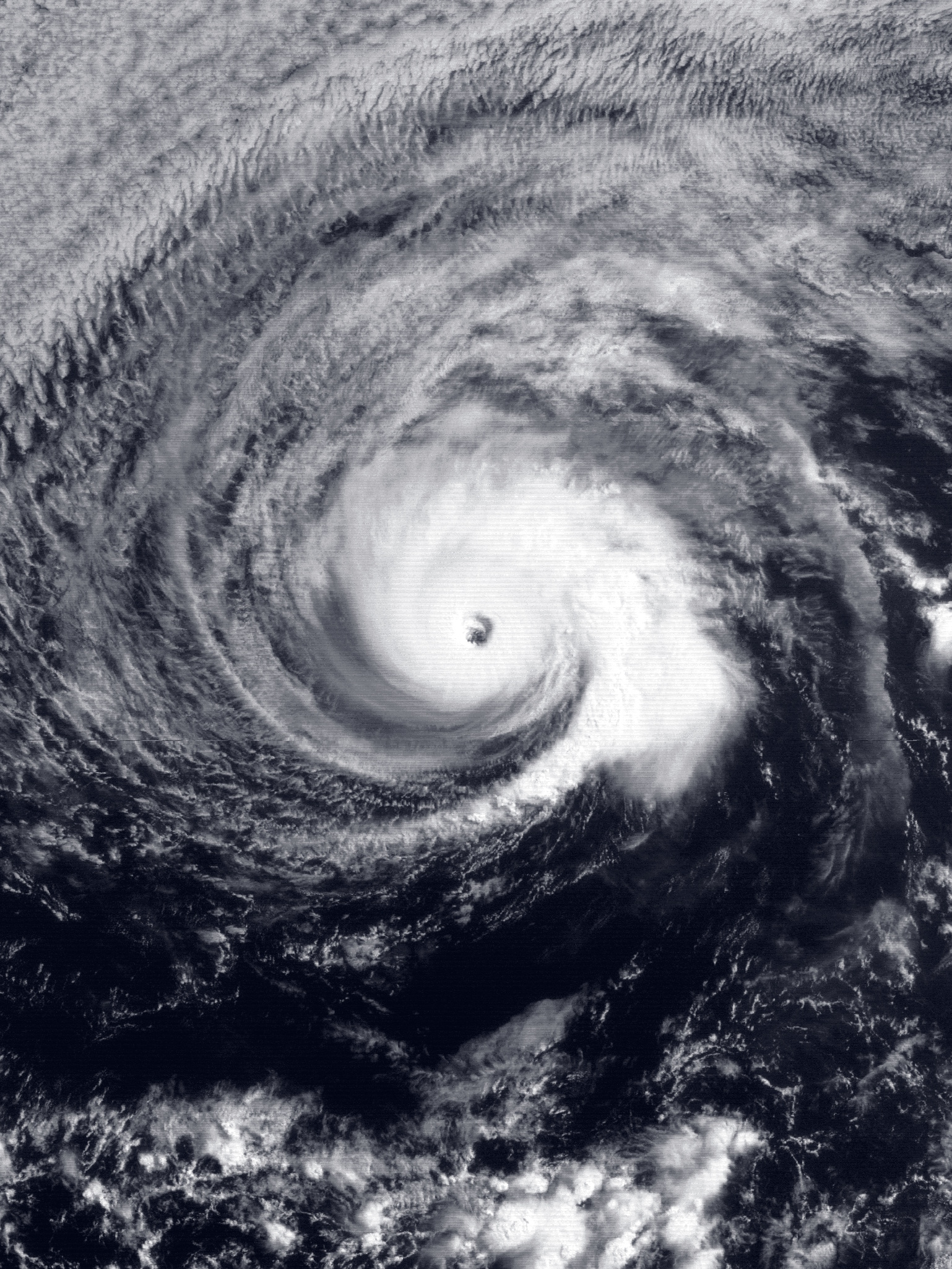
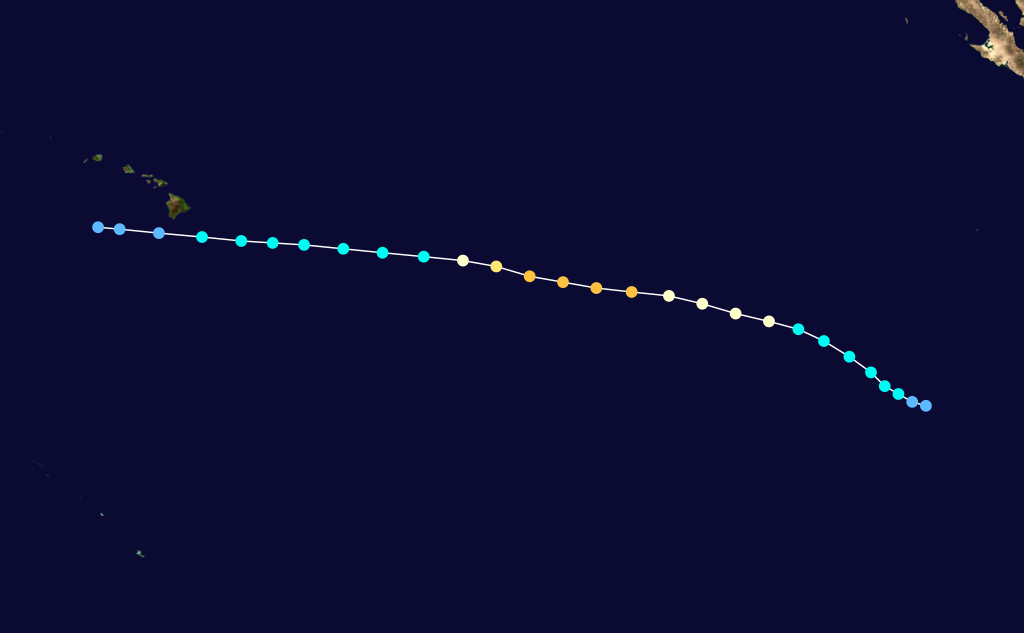
- Duration: July 26 – August 2
- Peak intensity: 125 mph (205 km/h) (1-min);

Tropical Depression Thirteen-E formed near 9.5°N 117°30'W and moved slightly north of west. Tropical storm status was attained near noon on July 26, and the cyclone crossed the threshold of hurricane strength late on the night of July 27. By noon on July 29, Gilma reached it maximum intensity of 125 mph (200 km/h) well to the east-southeast of Hawaii. The cyclone weakened and sped up its motion to the west-northwest, crossing into the Central Pacific Basin as a category one hurricane very early on July 30. Gilma was downgraded to a tropical storm late in the morning of July 30, and a tropical depression early on the morning of August 1 as the circulation passed 50 mi (80 km) south of South Point. The cyclone dissipated late on August 1 as it passed 200 mi (300 km) south of Kauai.

=== Hurricane Hector ===
- Category 1 hurricane (SSHWS)
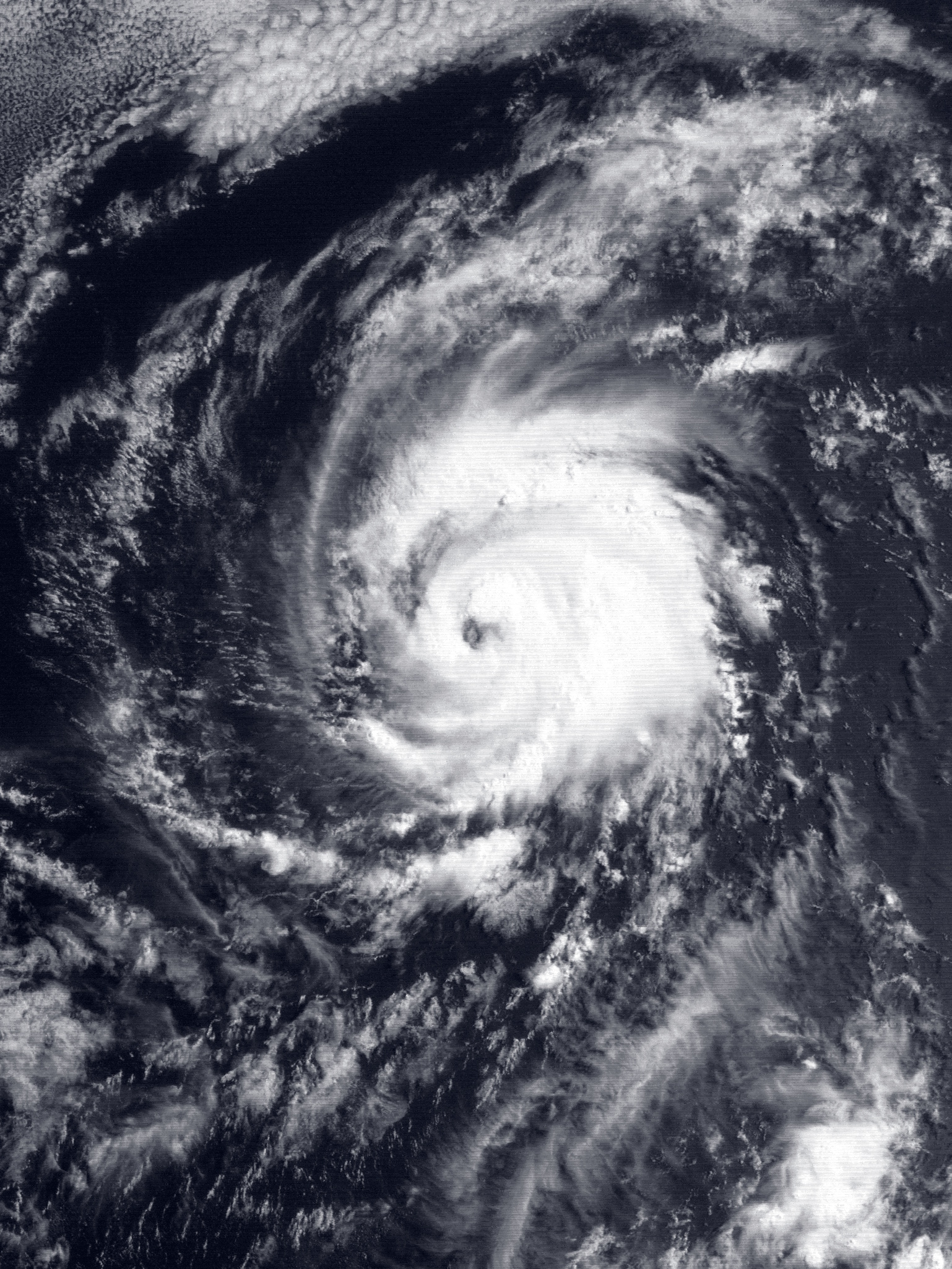
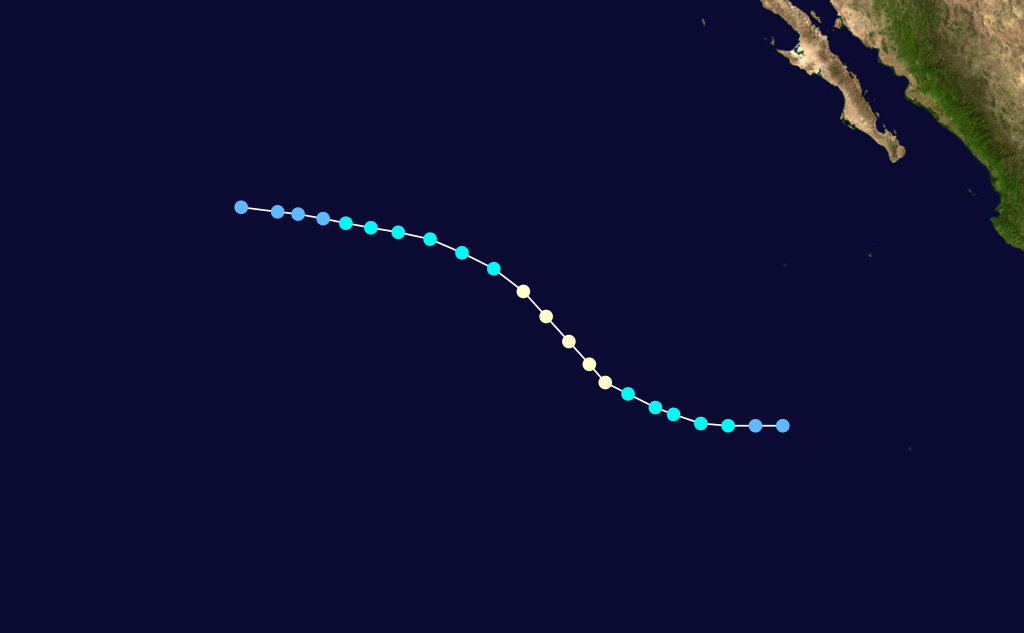
- Duration: July 29 – August 3
- Peak intensity: 75 mph (120 km/h) (1-min);

On July 23, a tropical wave moved off the Colombian coast. The related convection moved westward at over 20 mph (30 km/h). By the evening of July 27, the system slowed its forward motion. The next evening, a tropical depression organized within the thunderstorm activity well to the south of Baja California. Strengthening continued, as Hector became a tropical storm on the morning of July 29 and a hurricane by noon on July 30. A combination of vertical wind shear and cooler waters ahead of the cyclone led to its weakening trend, which hastened on August 1. It weakened to a tropical storm on the morning of August 2 and to a depression soon thereafter while located midway between the Hawaiian Islands and southern Baja California.

=== Tropical Storm Iva ===
- Tropical storm (SSHWS)
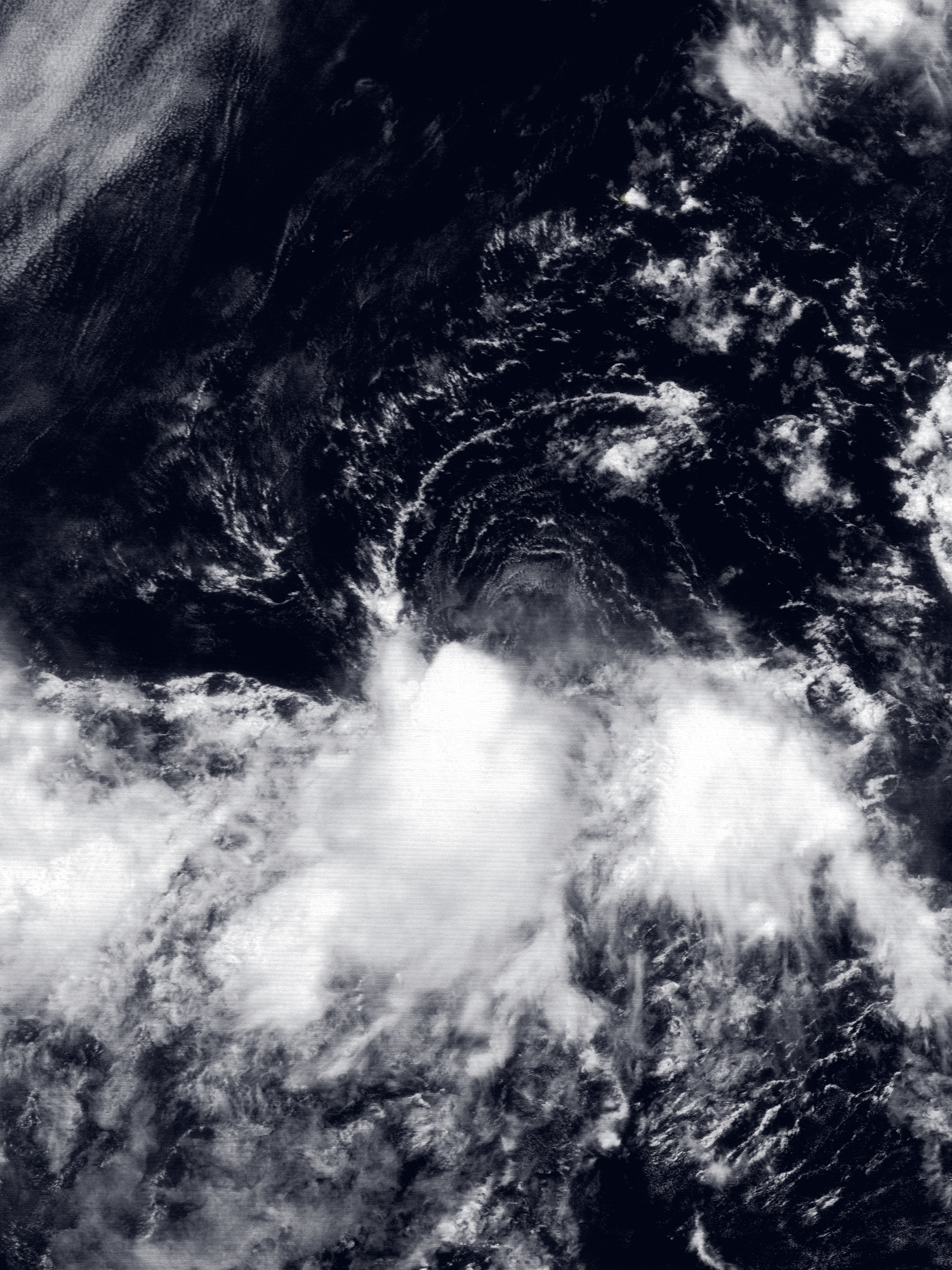
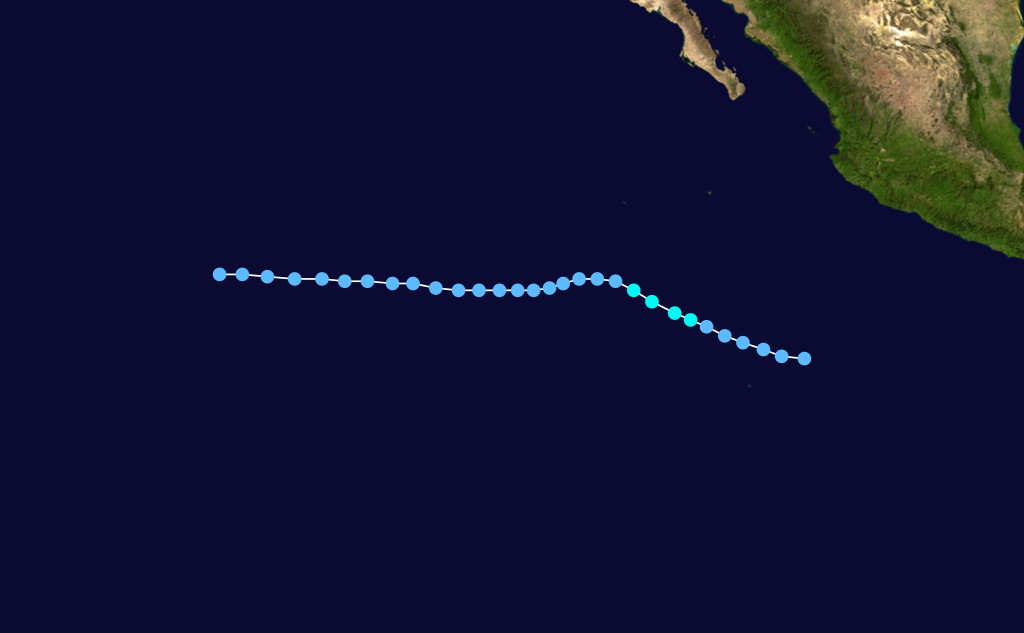
- Duration: August 1 – August 8
- Peak intensity: 40 mph (65 km/h) (1-min);

A tropical disturbance was discovered 300 mi (485 km) south of Acapulco on July 31. Moving west-northwest, it achieved tropical depression status that night and tropical storm status on August 2 while 800 mi (1,340 km) west-southwest of Acapulco. Northeasterly upper-level shear appears to have been Iva's nemesis, as the system weakened back into a tropical depression by the afternoon of August 3 as it turned west-southwest. The depression maintained strength for another several days before dissipating well east-southwest of Hilo, Hawaii, on the morning of August 8.

=== Hurricane John ===
- Category 3 hurricane (SSHWS)
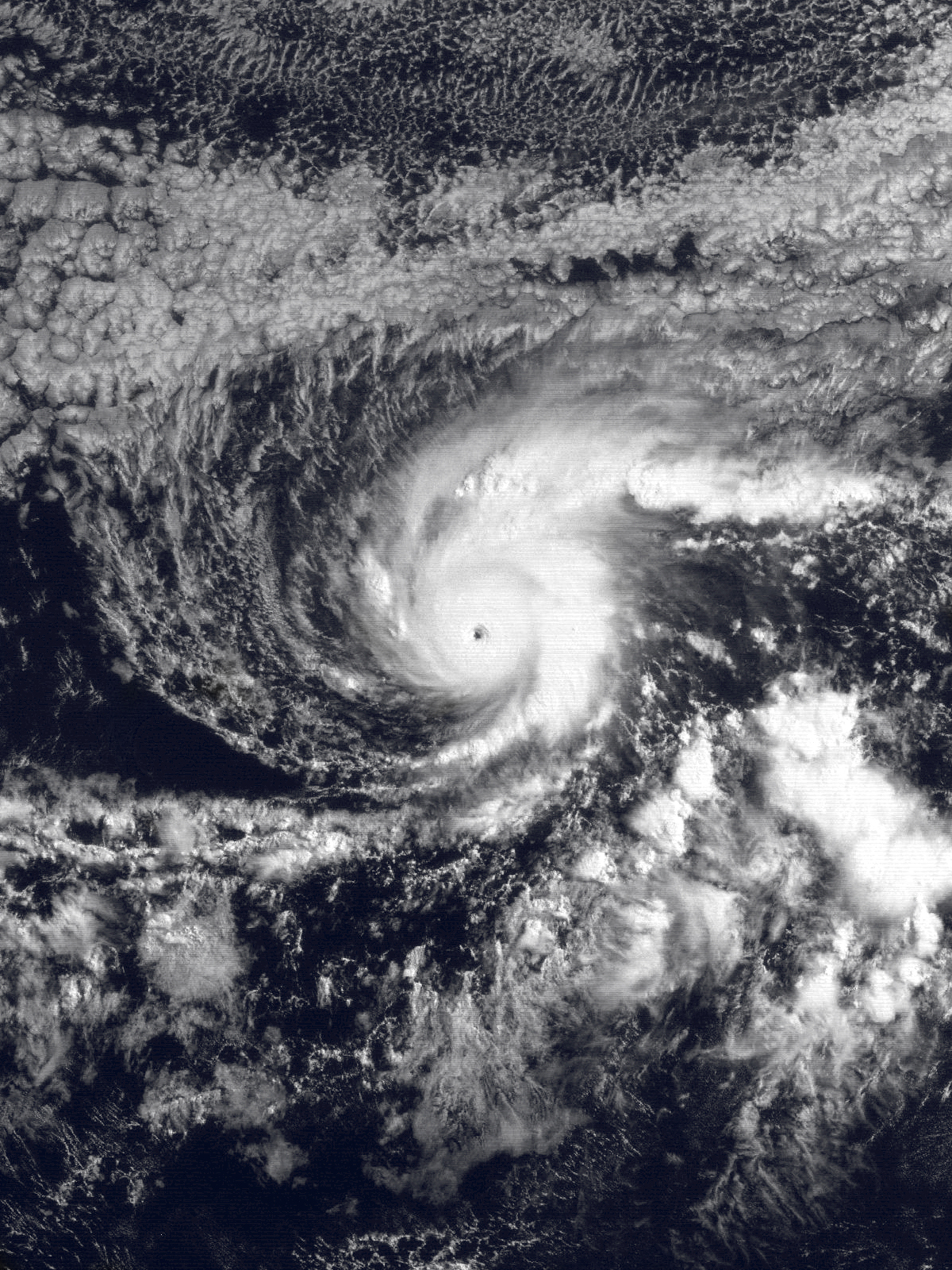
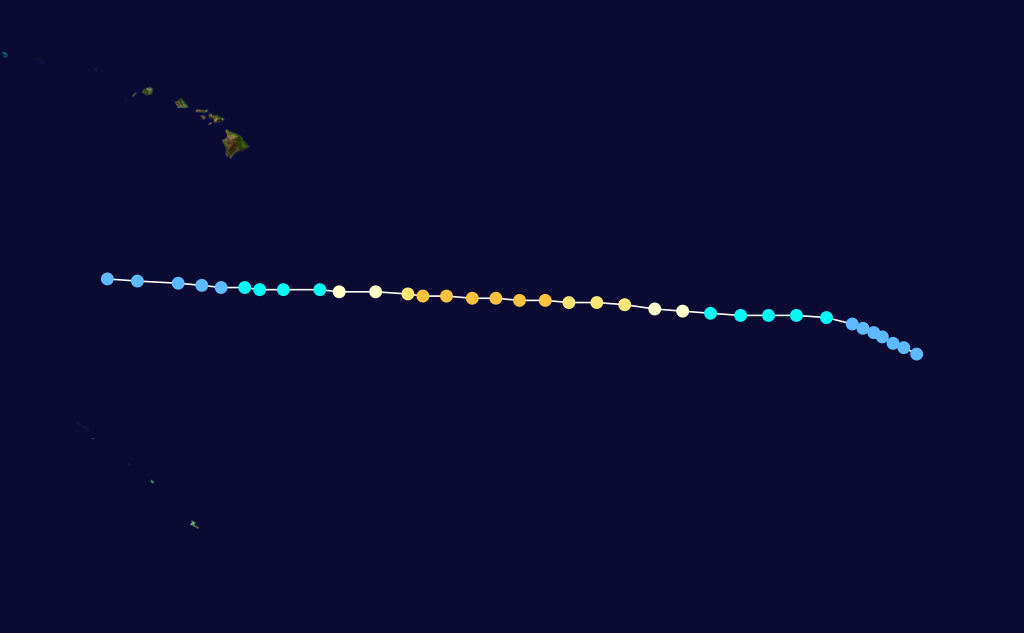
- Duration: August 2 – August 11
- Peak intensity: 115 mph (185 km/h) (1-min);

Tropical Depression Sixteen-E formed on August 3 in the East Pacific between Hawaii and Mexico. The system intensified into a tropical storm by noon August 4, and a hurricane on the morning of August 5. John reached its peak intensity of 115 mph (185 km/h) as it moved into the Central Pacific Basin on August 6. Weakening commenced on August 7 due to westerly vertical wind shear caused by the semi-permanent mid-oceanic upper trough, and John weakened to a tropical storm on the night of August 8. It passed by as a tropical depression about 180 mi (290 km) south of the Island of Hawaii, and dissipated late on August 10 to the southwest of Hawaii.

=== Hurricane Kristy ===
- Category 1 hurricane (SSHWS)
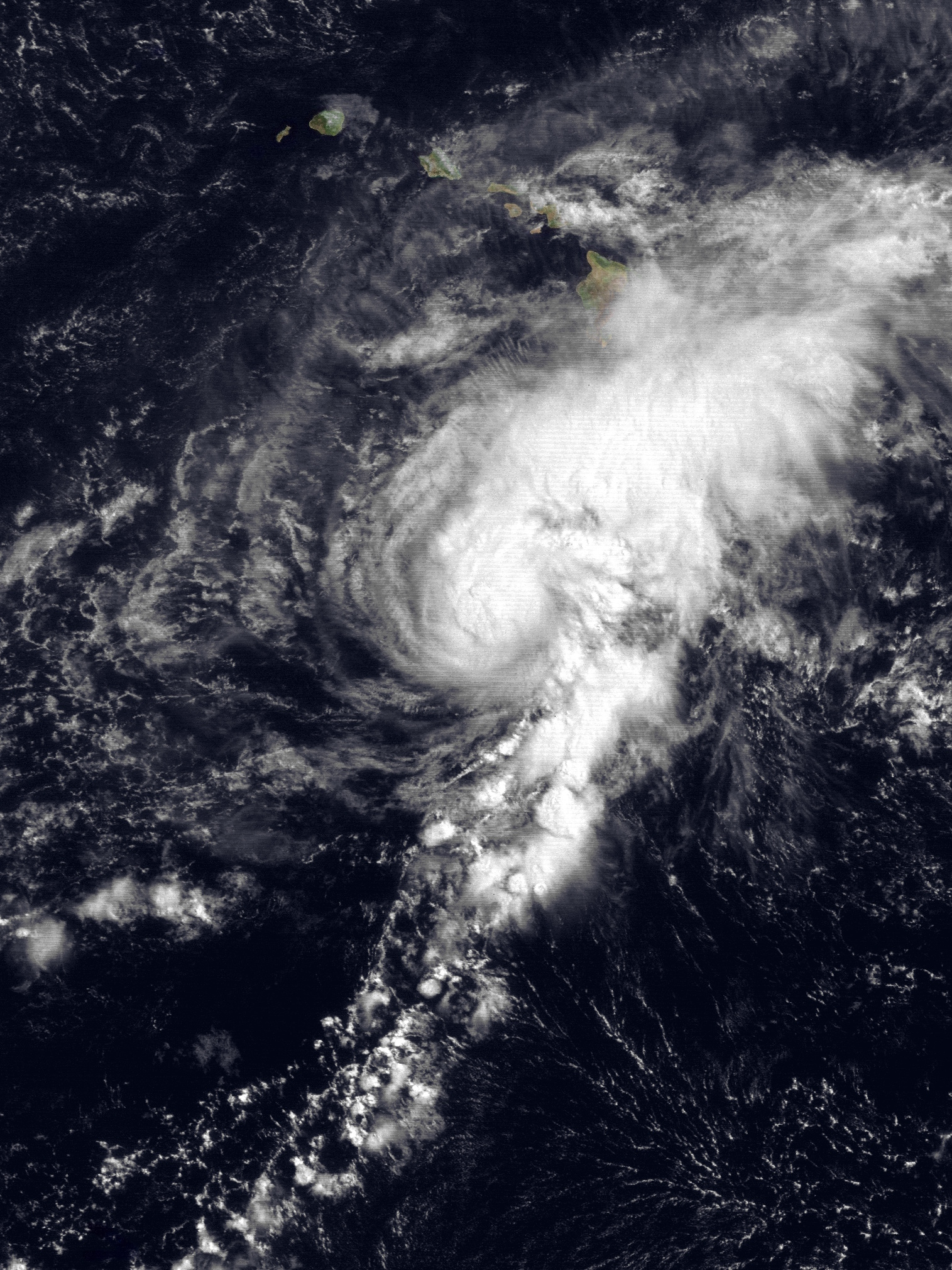
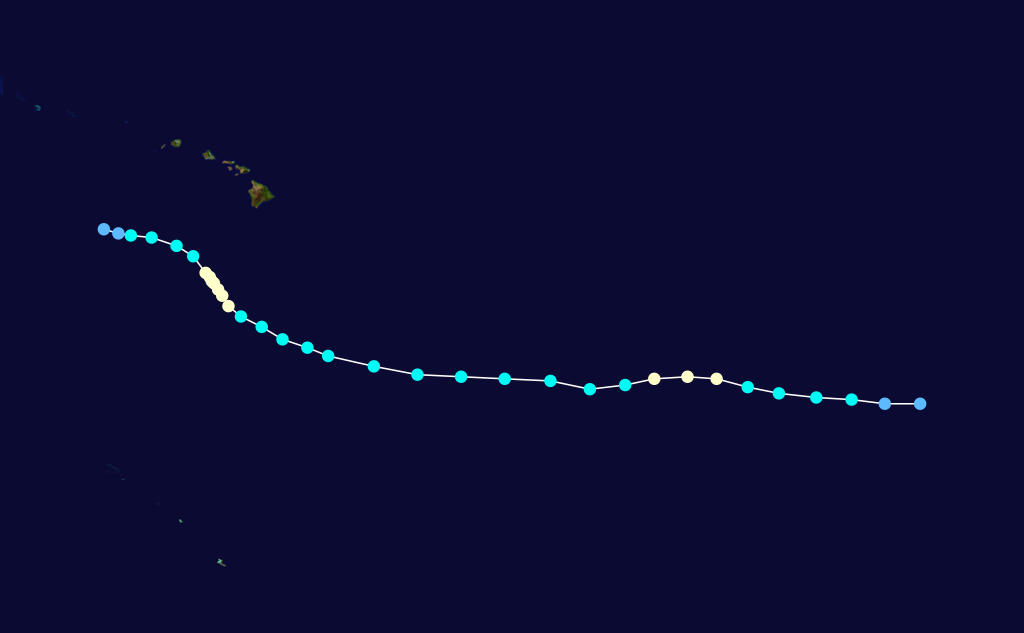
- Duration: August 8 – August 17
- Peak intensity: 90 mph (150 km/h) (1-min); 982 mbar (hPa)

Tropical Depression Seventeen-E formed by noon on August 8 in the East Pacific. The low moved west, intensified, and became Tropical Storm Kristy by midnight, and a hurricane by midnight on the night of August 9. Weakening as it entered the Central Pacific, Kristy regained tropical storm status late on August 10 while moving south of due west at a rapid 30 mph (48 km/h). As it slowed down and turned northwest, Kristy began to restrengthen. Hurricane intensity was reached again on the evening of August 13. By noon on August 14, the cyclone passed 250 mi (400 km) south of South Point, Hawaii. Westerly winds aloft slowed Kristy's forward motion down additionally, and Kristy weakened back into a tropical storm on August 15. Turning more to the west with the low level wind flow, the cyclone was downgraded to a tropical depression by noon on August 16 and dissipated that night southwest of Hawaii.

=== Tropical Storm Lane ===
- Tropical storm (SSHWS)
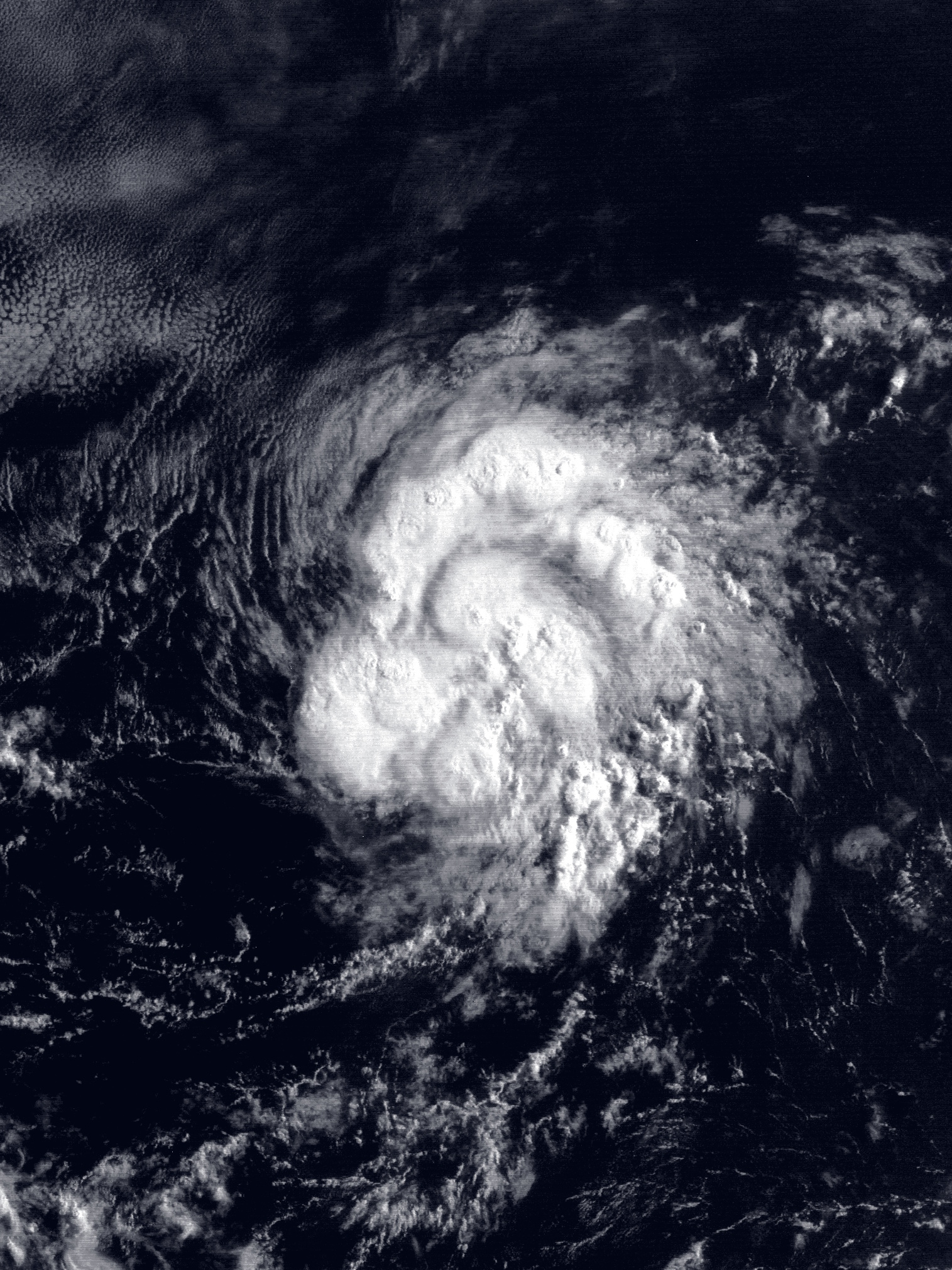
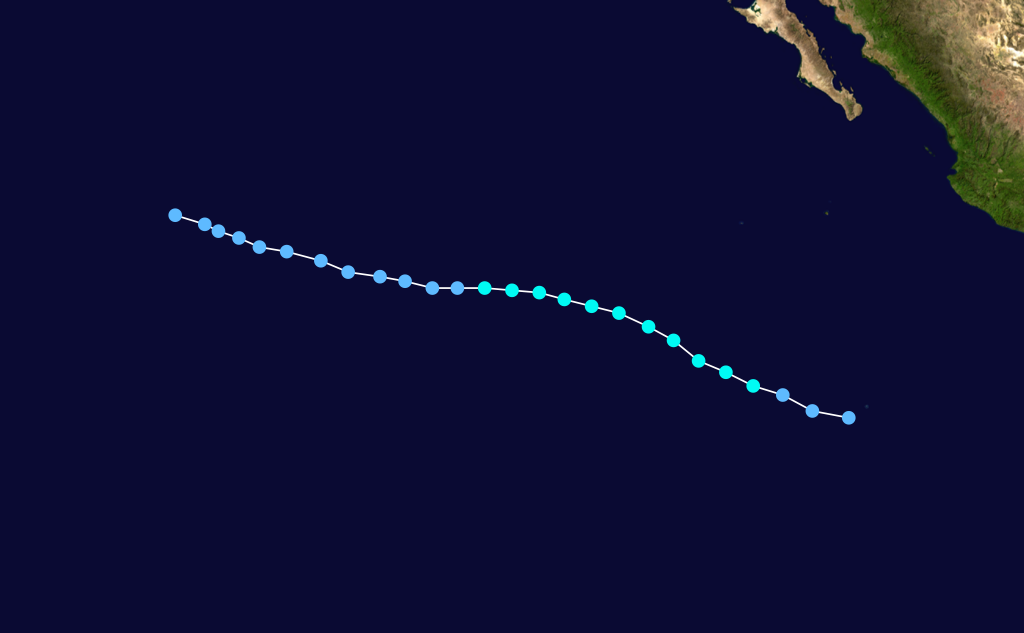
- Duration: August 8 – August 15
- Peak intensity: 65 mph (100 km/h) (1-min);

The originating disturbance of this system emerged off San José, Costa Rica on August 4 and slowly consolidated. By the afternoon of August 8, Tropical Depression Eighteen-E developed well south of Cabo San Lucas. The next morning it had continued strengthening into a tropical storm. Maximum sustained winds reached 60 mph (97 km/h) as it continued moving west-northwest. Vertical wind shear reached Lane on August 10, which led to weakening. It weakened to a tropical depression late on August 11, but sporadic thunderstorm blowups near the center kept the system alive for another few days. Dissipation occurred on the evening of August 14 as it crossed the 140th meridian west.

=== Hurricane Miriam ===
- Category 1 hurricane (SSHWS)
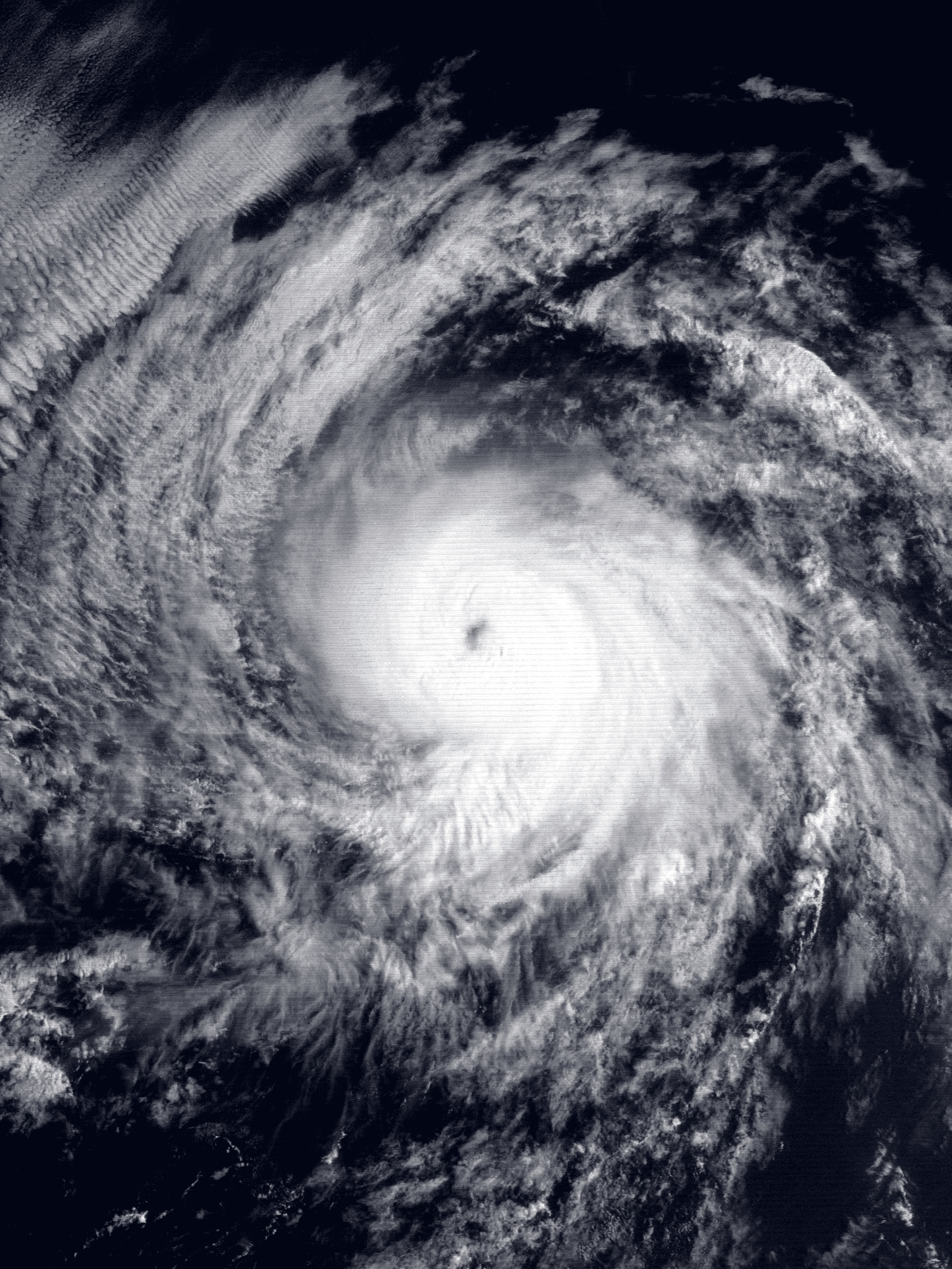
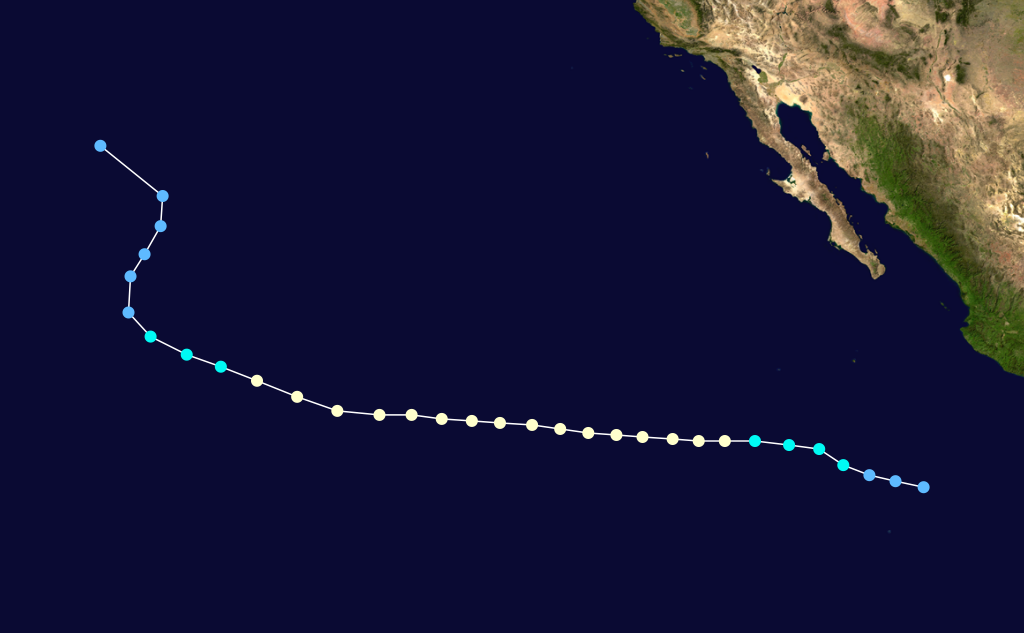
- Duration: August 30 – September 6
- Peak intensity: 85 mph (140 km/h) (1-min);

Tropical Depression Nineteen-E formed on August 29 a couple hundred miles southwest of Manzanillo, Mexico. The depression moved west-northwestward, intensifying into a tropical storm by noon on August 30 and a hurricane by noon on August 31. Peak intensity of 90 mph (145 km/h) was attained during the early morning of September 1. For the next couple of days, Miriam remained unchanged in strength. By late on September 3, a weakening trend was realized as it passed into the Central Pacific by the afternoon of September 4. Shearing apart soon afterwards, the low moved northwest and weakened into a tropical depression well to the east of Hawaii on the morning of September 5. It drifted north, and became a nontropical low by September 6. The cyclone was last noted near 30°N 149°W, continuing its northward trek.

=== Tropical Storm Akoni ===
- Tropical storm (SSHWS)
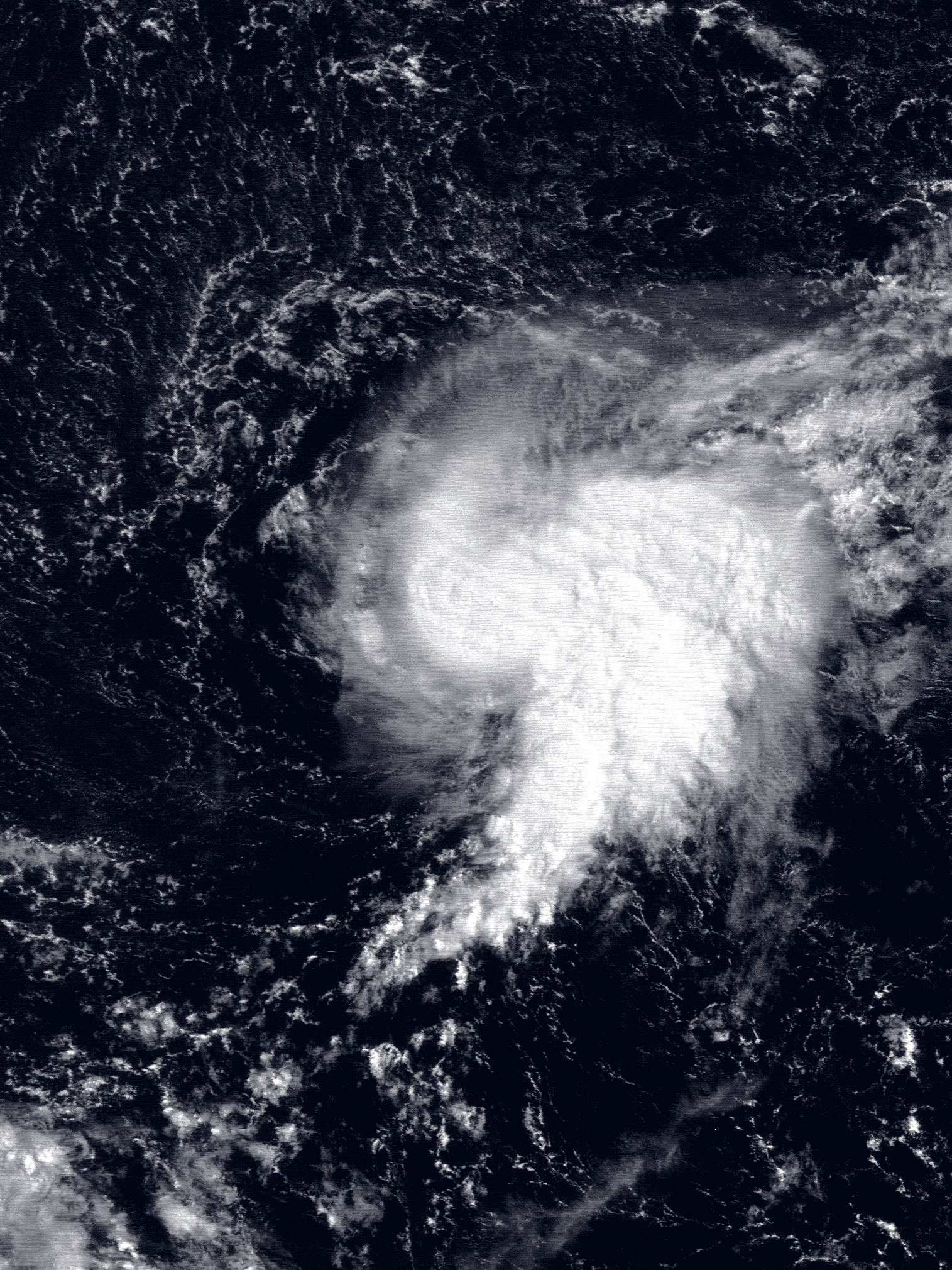
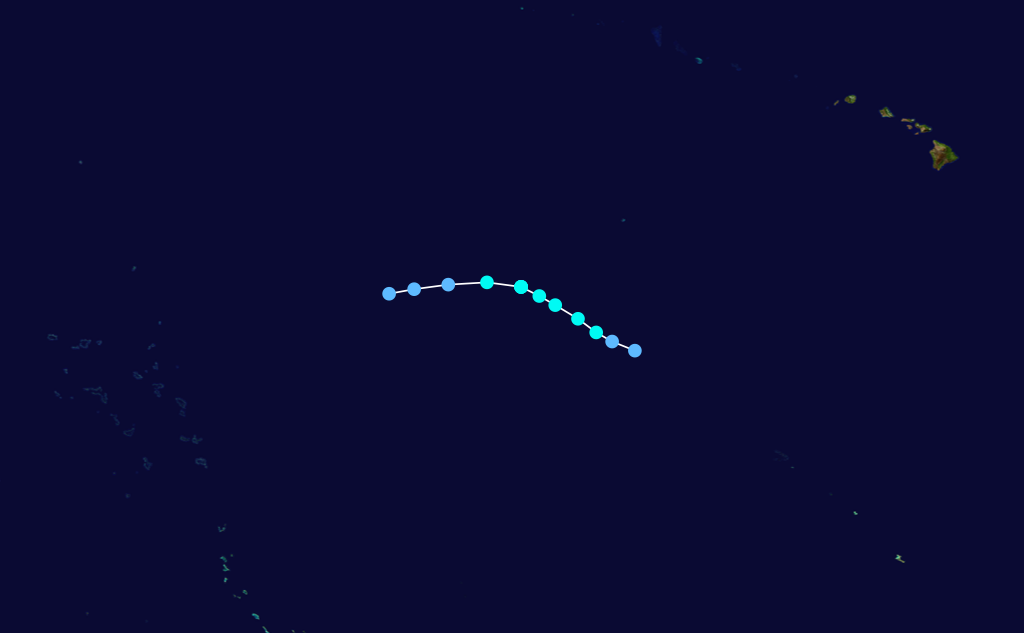
- Duration: August 30 – September 2
- Peak intensity: 50 mph (85 km/h) (1-min);

Tropical Depression One-C formed along the eastern end of the West Pacific monsoon trough on August 30 about 700 mi (1120 km) east of the International Dateline, well to the west-southwest of Hawaii. Moving slowly westward, the system intensified rapidly into a tropical storm by noon and was named Akoni. Maximum sustained winds increased to 60 mph (97 km/h) late on August 31 as Akoni moved near the ship Nana Lolo a few hundred miles east of the International Dateline. An upper trough to the northwest set Akoni on a weakening curve, and the cyclone diminished to a tropical depression on the evening of September 1 as it moved with the low level flow. The weakening depression passed the International Dateline into the western Pacific on the morning of September 2.

=== Hurricane Norman ===
- Category 2 hurricane (SSHWS)
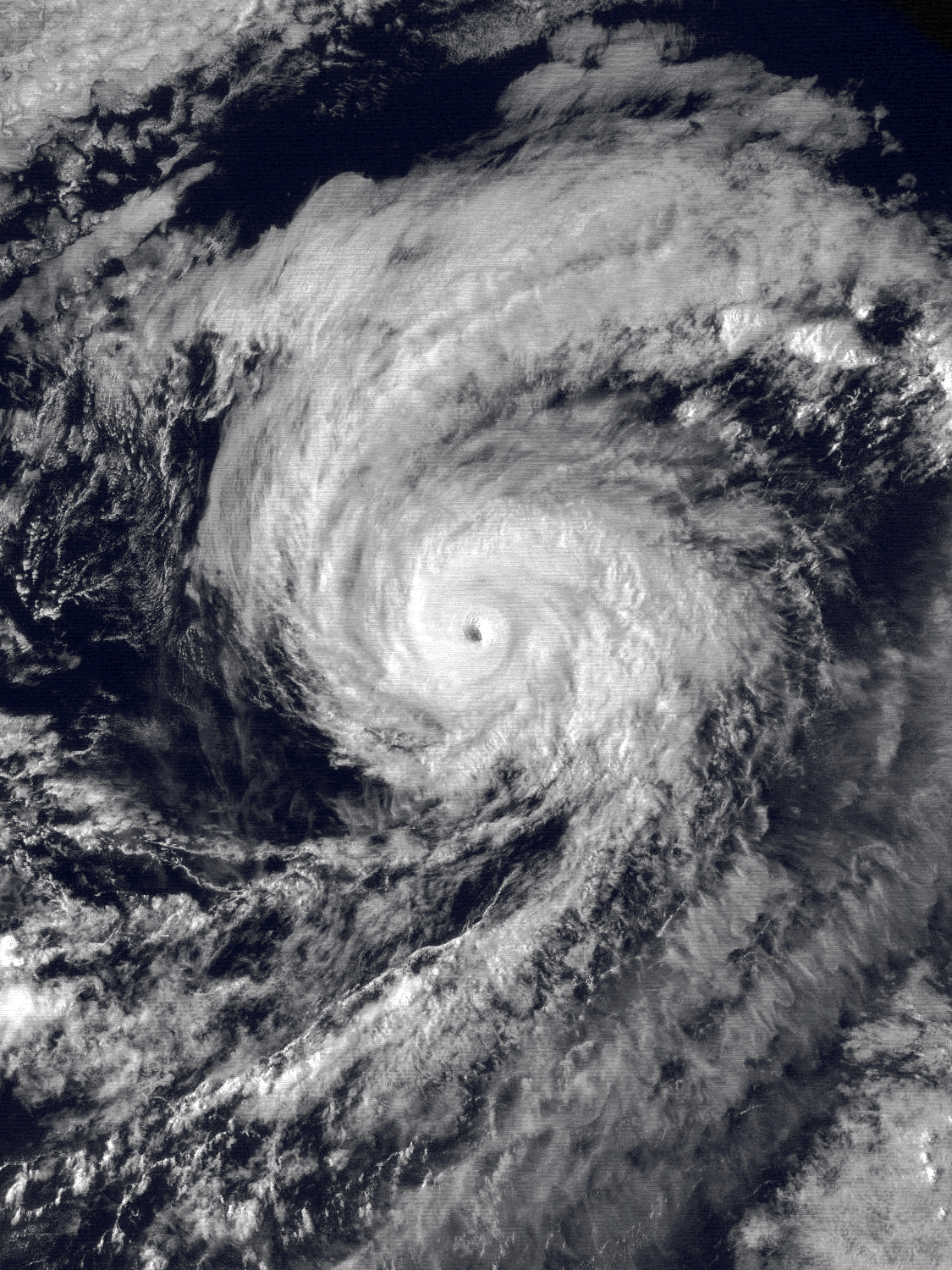
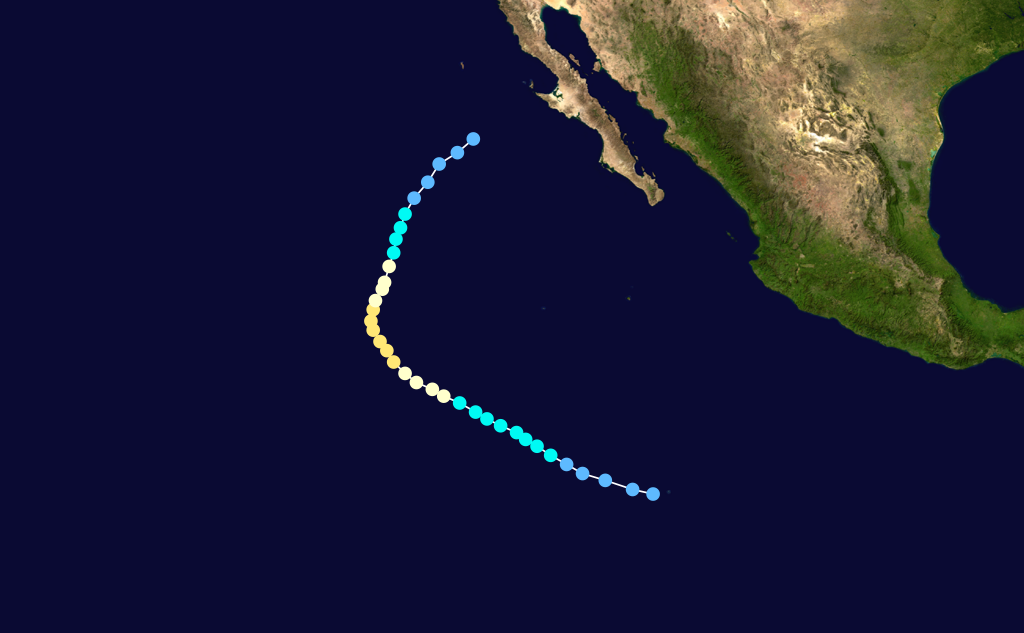
- Duration: September 9 – September 18
- Peak intensity: 105 mph (165 km/h) (1-min);

Northeasterly shear slowed the development of the initial tropical depression which formed into Norman. Strengthening began in earnest on September 11, and the cyclone became a tropical storm, and then a hurricane by early on September 13. Maximum sustained winds reached nearly 95 mph (153 km/h) by September 15. A mid-latitude trough dug in from the north, weakening the ridge north of Norman and leading to a northward motion. Increased vertical wind shear and cooler waters weakened the hurricane, with dissipation occurring just west of Baja California on September 18. On September 17 and 18, moisture from Norman brought scattered rain to California and Arizona.

=== Tropical Depression Twenty-One-E ===
- Tropical depression (SSHWS)
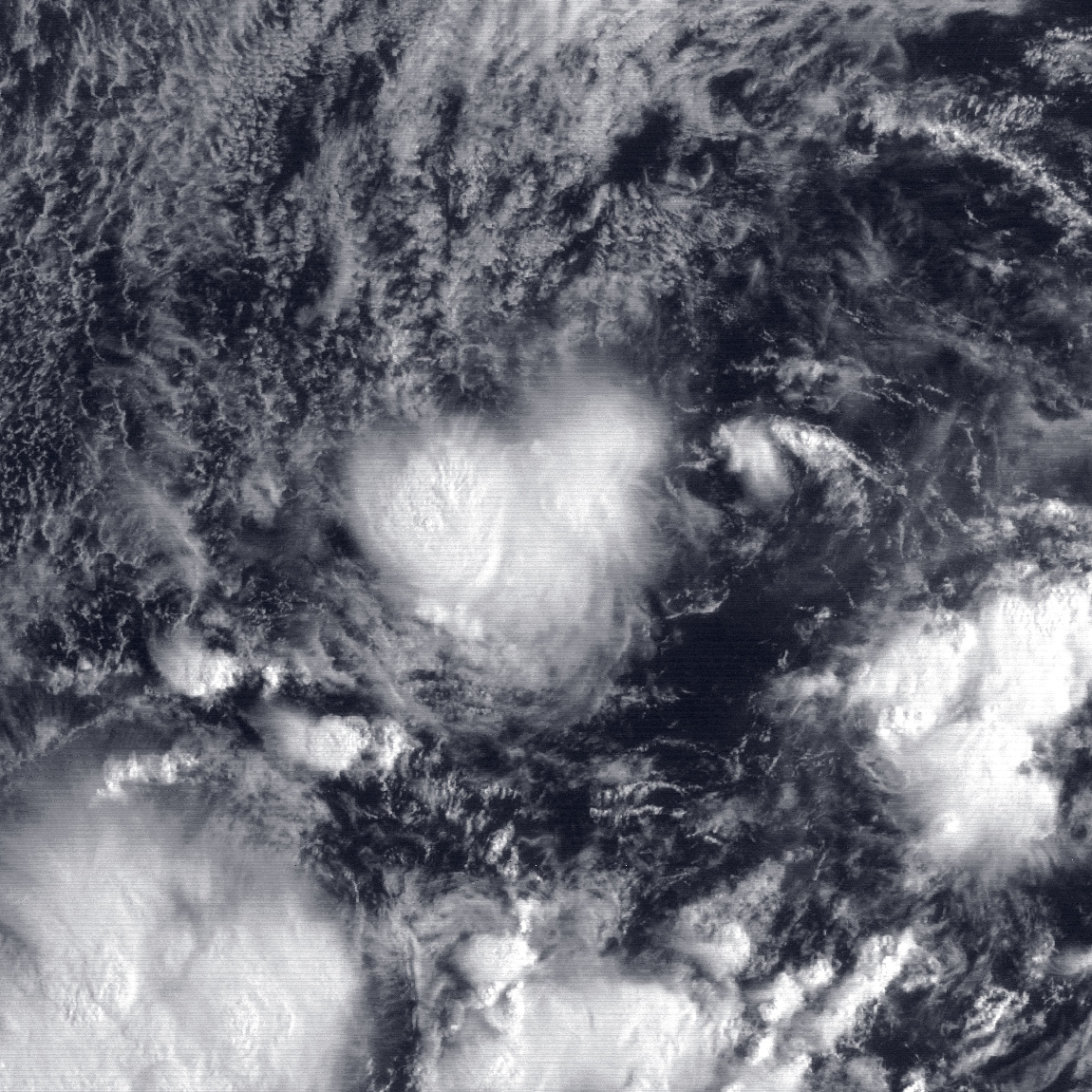
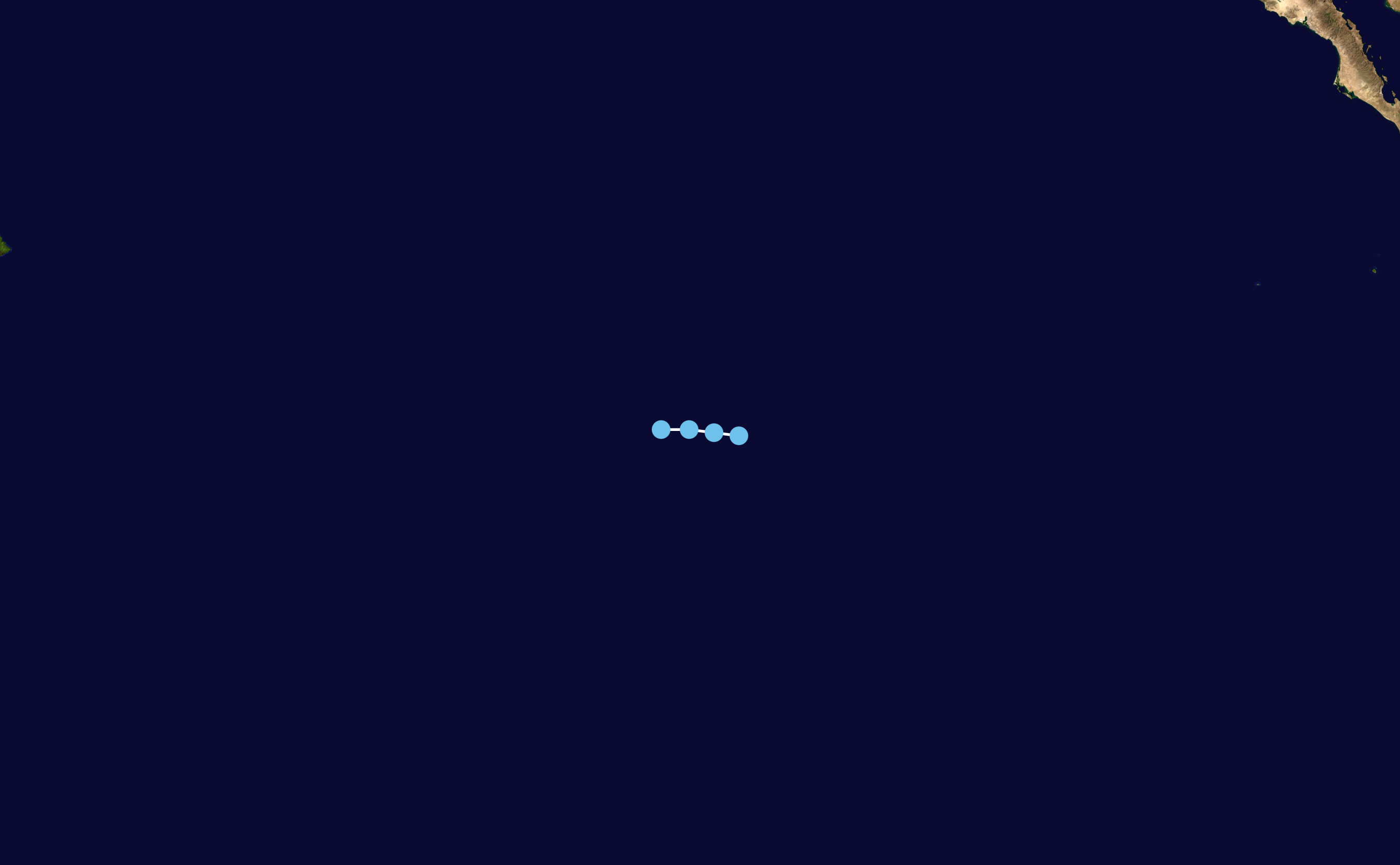
- Duration: September 10 – September 12
- Peak intensity: 35 mph (55 km/h) (1-min);

A tropical depression formed well east-southeast of Hawaii late on September 10. Moving over cooler waters soon after formation, the depression dissipated by the next evening near 14°N 134°W.

=== Tropical Storm Ema ===
- Tropical storm (SSHWS)
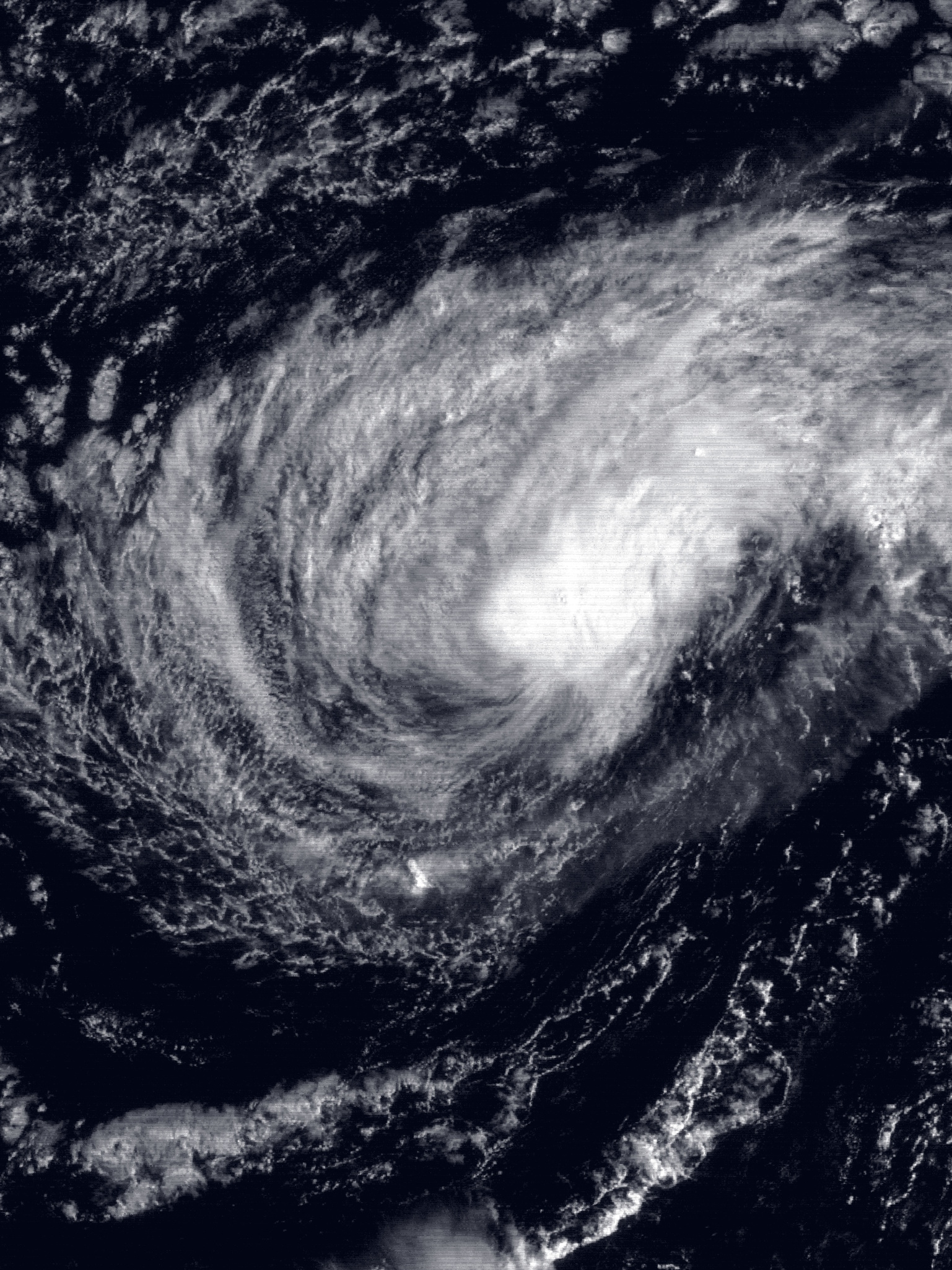
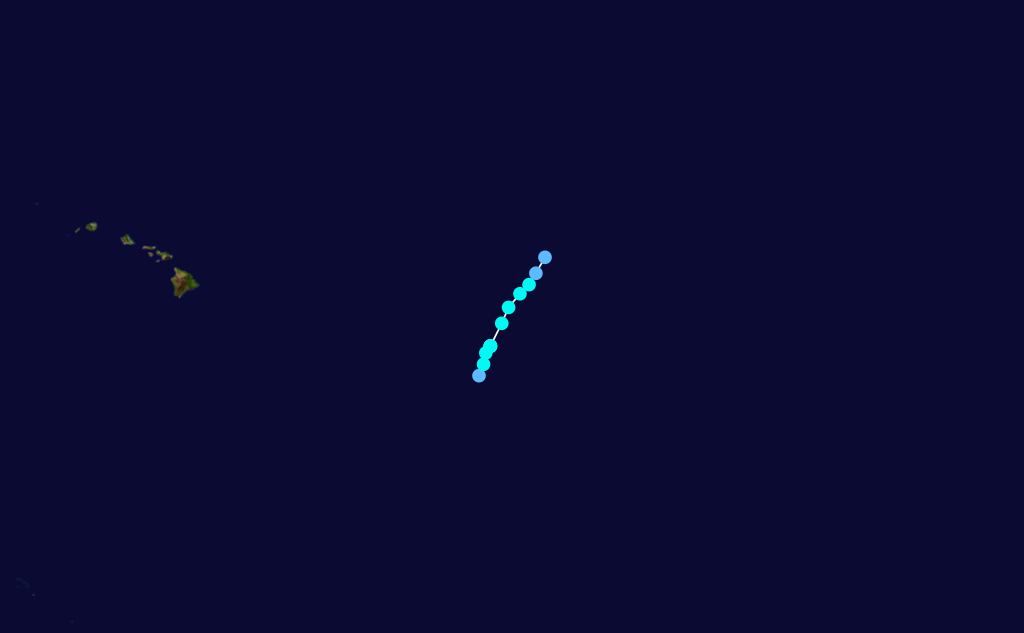
- Duration: September 15 – September 19
- Peak intensity: 45 mph (75 km/h) (1-min);

An area of convection formed near 15°N 140°W and by September 15, a tropical depression had formed within the thunderstorm activity. Strengthening as it moved slowly north-northeast, the cyclone became a tropical storm late that day. Ema became stationary between the morning of September 16 and September 17 before resuming its north-northeast heading. Its peak intensity was 45 mph (72 km/h). Upper-level shear weakened the system into a tropical depression by noon on September 18. As it crossed the 140th meridian west back into the eastern Pacific near the 20th parallel north, the depression dissipated.

=== Tropical Storm Hana ===
- Tropical storm (SSHWS)
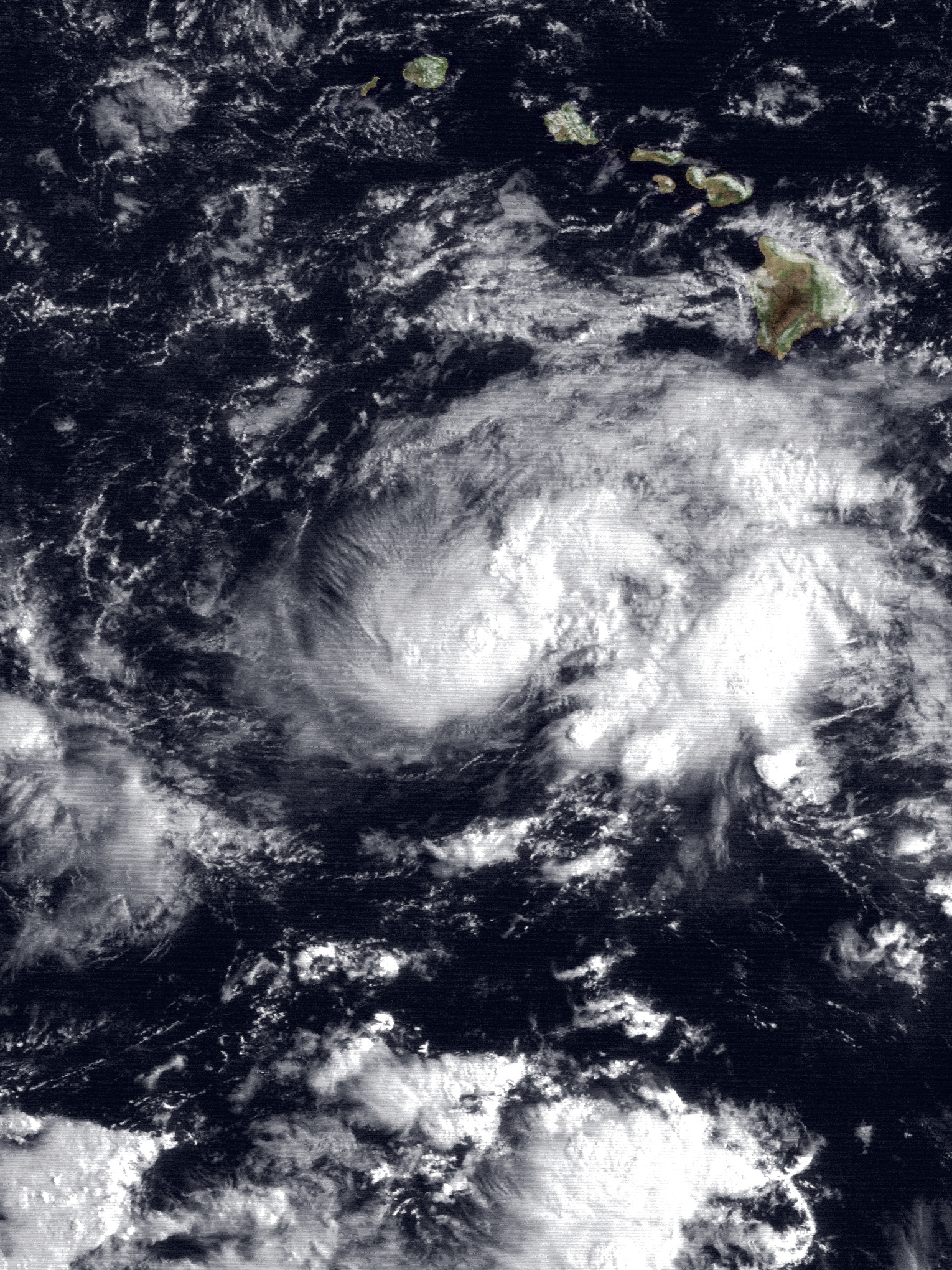
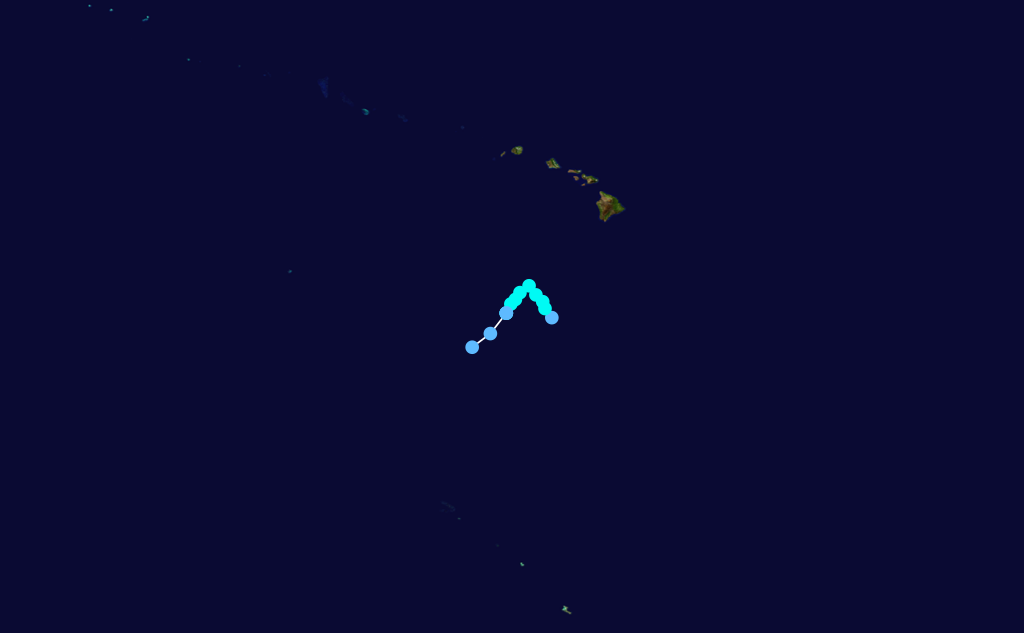
- Duration: September 15 – September 19
- Peak intensity: 45 mph (75 km/h) (1-min);

An area of thunderstorms stewed south of the Hawaiian Islands for several days. By September 15, it had organized into Tropical Depression Three-C, and quickly became a tropical storm that afternoon. The cyclone moved north-northwest for a day before slowing to a crawl for the next day. The cyclone turned southwest and weakened into a tropical depression due to vertical wind shear. It dissipated southwest of Hawaii near 13°N 162°W late on September 18.

=== Hurricane Olivia ===
- Category 4 hurricane (SSHWS)
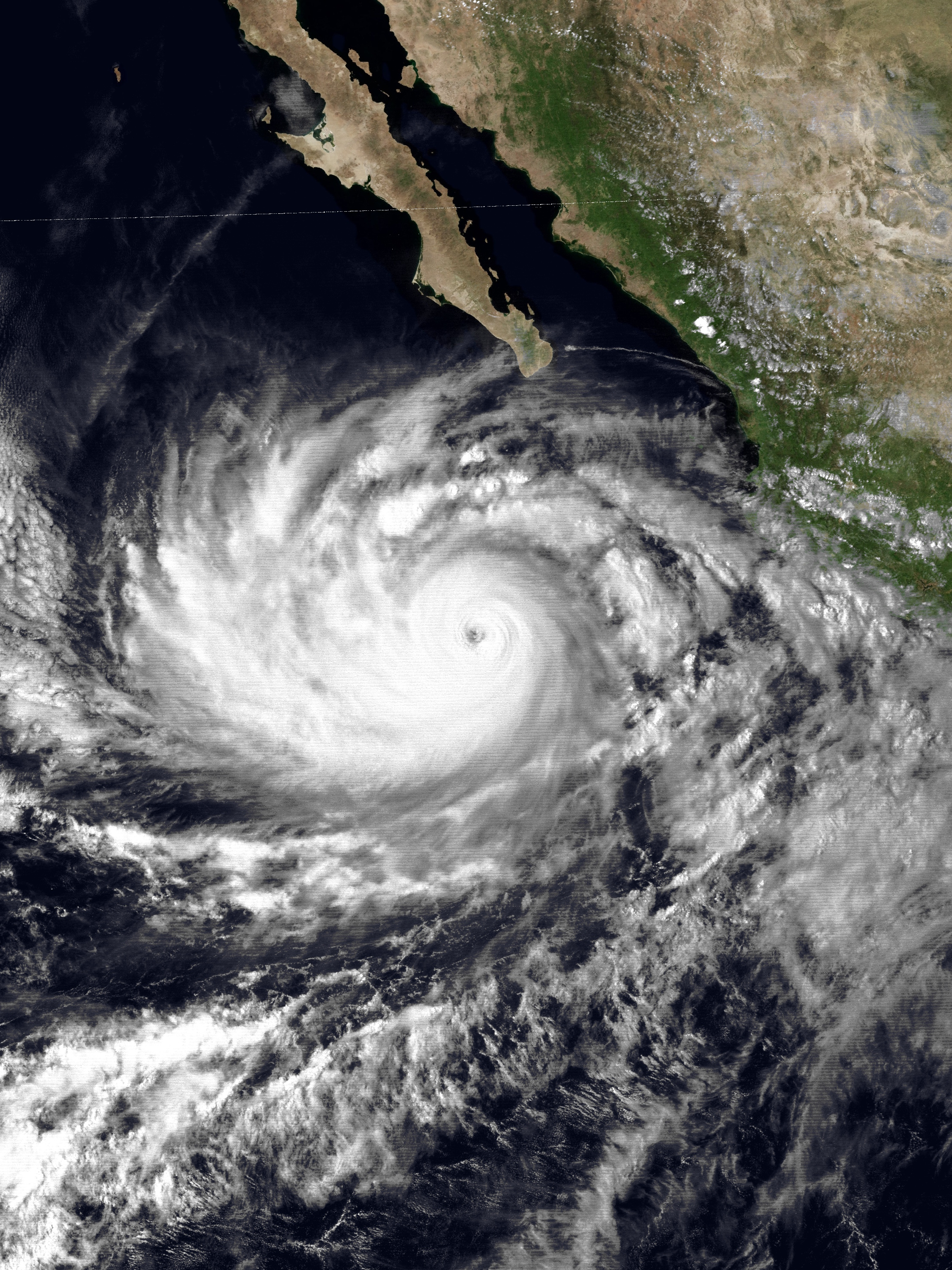
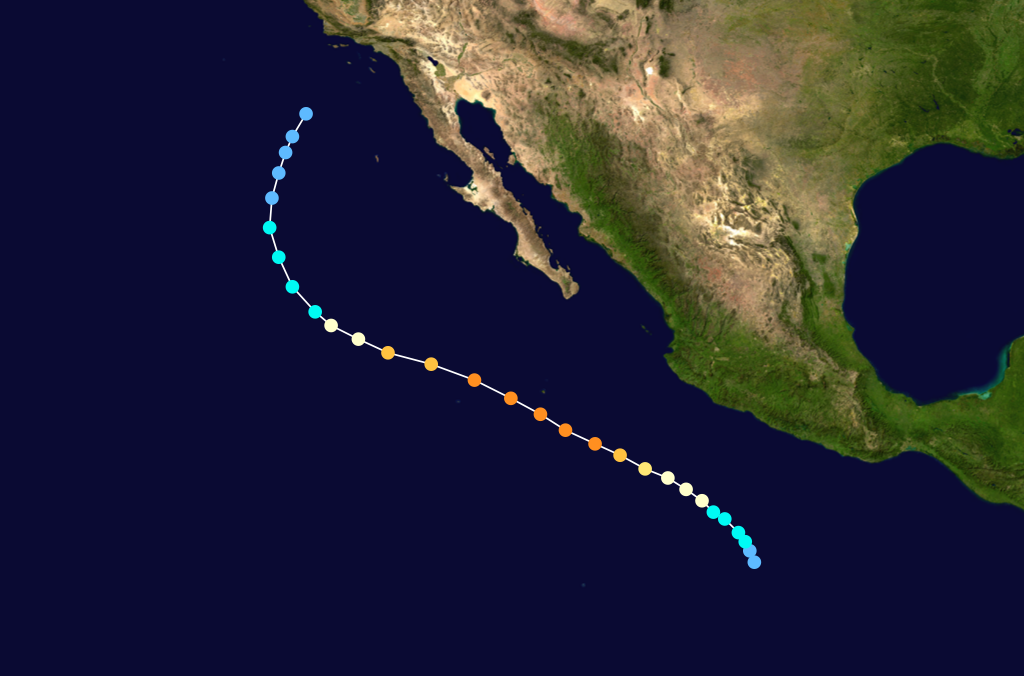
- Duration: September 18 – September 25
- Peak intensity: 145 mph (230 km/h) (1-min);

Ship reports indicated that a tropical depression had formed about 400 miles (640 km) south-southwest of Acapulco around noon on September 18. The system drifted north-northwest, developing into a tropical storm that night. About 24 hours later, Olivia became a hurricane. Rapid intensification continued, and Olivia reached its peak intensity of 145 mph (230 km/h) winds around noon September 21, becoming the strongest storm of the season. The next day, waters under the tropical cyclone began to cool as the hurricane gained increasing latitude offshore Mexico. By noon on September 23, the cyclone had weakened into a tropical storm west of Baja California. Strong southwest flow to its north spread precipitation through the western United States into southwest Canada. The cyclone weakened to a tropical depression about 500 miles (800 km) southwest of San Diego and the surface low was last seen dissipating on September 25 about 250 miles (400 km) west-southwest of San Diego.

The heavy rain in California wiped out half of the raisin crop, a quarter of the wine crop, and a tenth of the tomato crop. Olivia's remnants brought rain totals of over 7 inches (177 mm) to California and northern Utah as they interacted with a strong upper level system and the local topography. The precipitation from this storm largely contributed to the record monthly precipitation in Salt Lake City, Utah, of 7.04 in (179 mm). These rains resulted in widespread losses, mainly from agriculture, amounting to $325 million (1982 USD).

=== Hurricane Paul ===
- Category 2 hurricane (SSHWS)
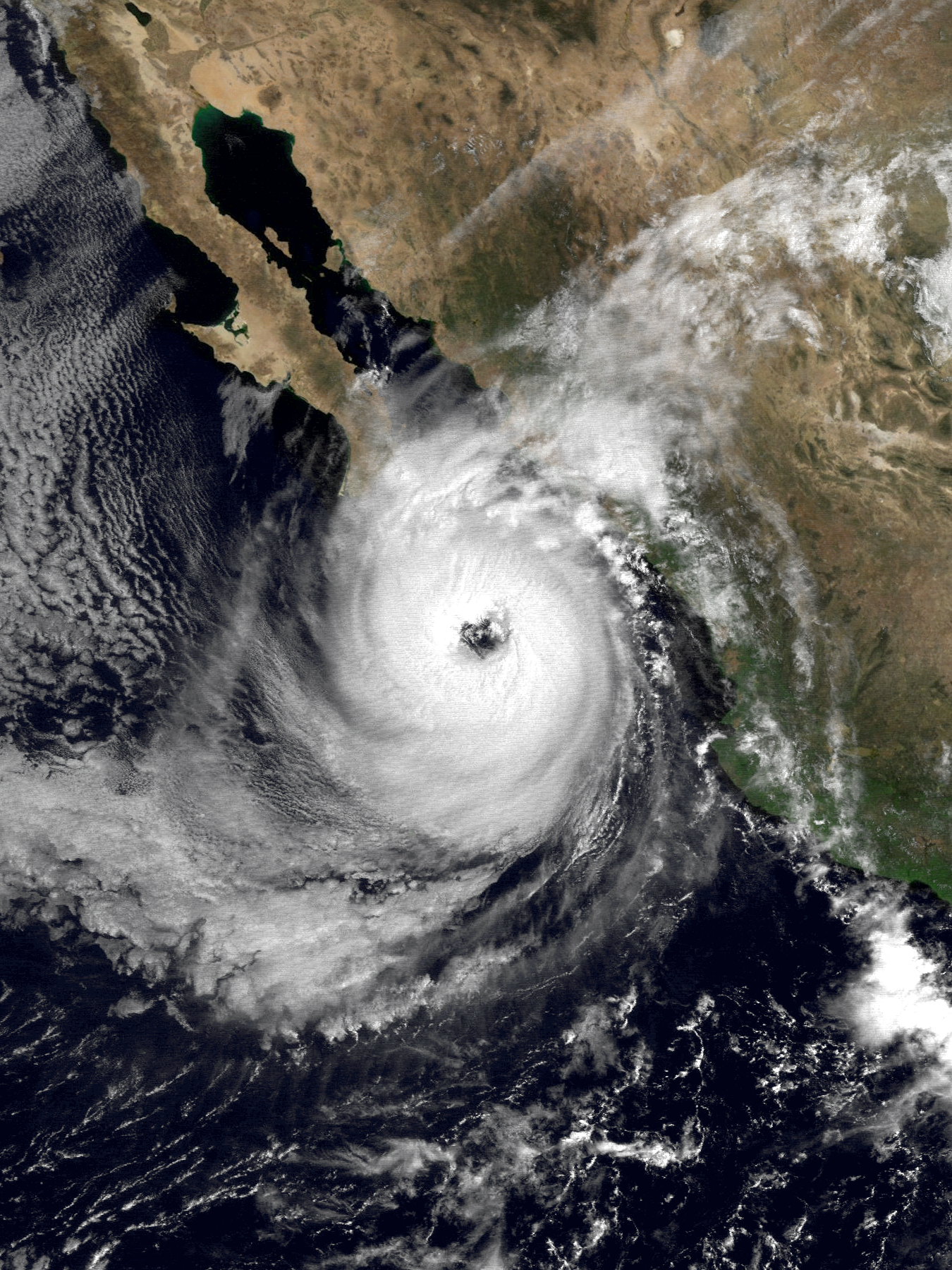
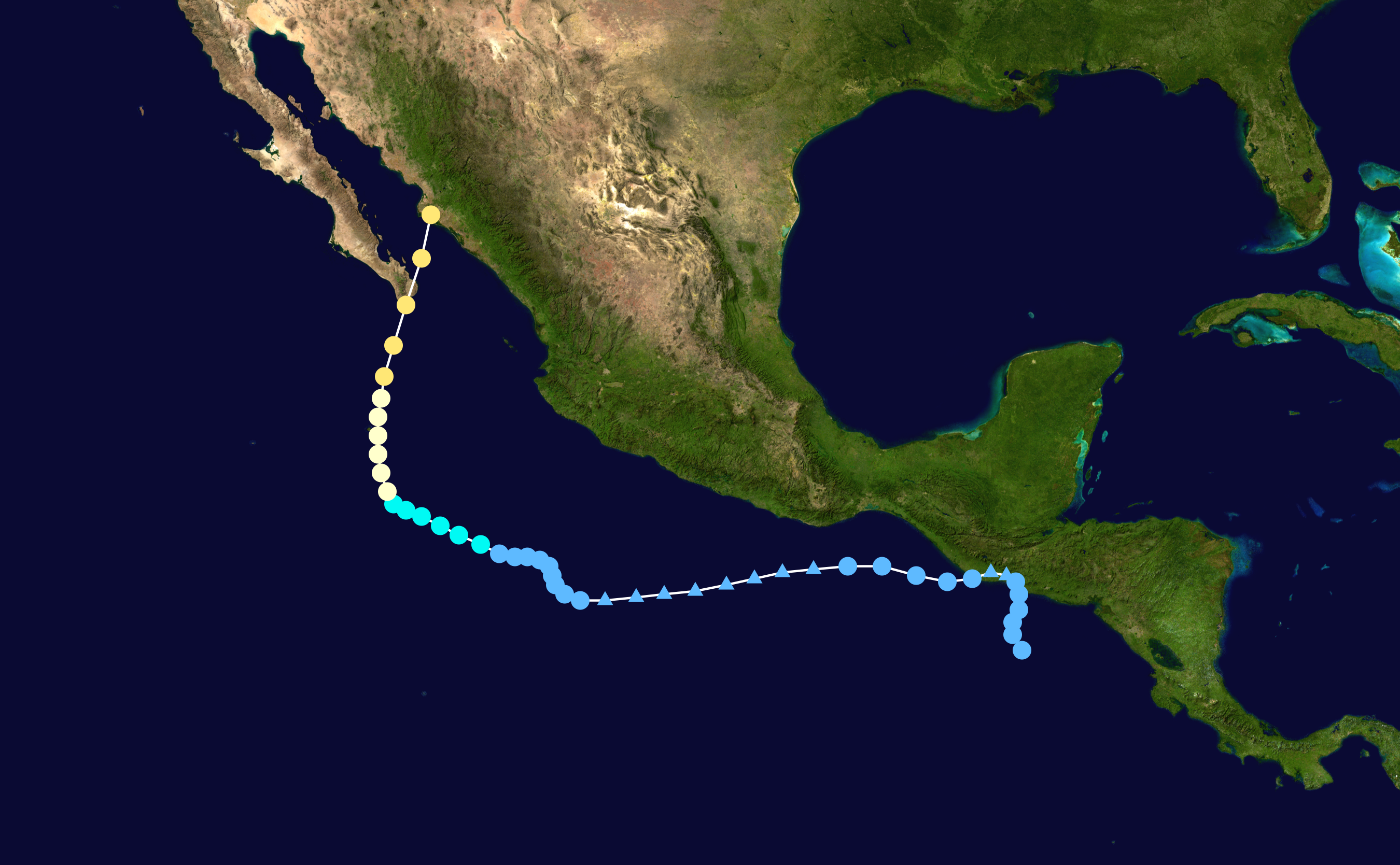
- Duration: September 18 – September 30
- Peak intensity: 110 mph (175 km/h) (1-min);

The precursor disturbance to Paul originated from an area of low barometric pressure and disorganized thunderstorms, which was first noted near the Pacific coast of Nicaragua on September 15. Five days later, the EPHC classified it as Tropical Depression Twenty-Two. The depression turned northward and then moved inland near the El Salvador–Guatemala border, and dissipated overland. The remains of the depression retraced westward back over the open waters of the Pacific, briefly regenerating into a tropical depression. The depression again degenerated into an open trough on September 22. Two days later, Paul regenerated for the third time. It gradually organized into a tropical storm at 0000 UTC September 25. Two days later, Paul became a hurricane and turned north. As the storm neared Baja California Sur, it reached Category 2 intensity. On September 29, the hurricane crossed Baja California Sur at peak intensity. After weakening slightly inland, Paul made its final landfall near Los Mochis before rapidly dissipating overland.

The tropical depression that later became Paul produced the worst natural disaster in El Salvador since 1965. A total of 761 people were killed 312 of which occurred in San Salvador, which also sustained the worst damage. About 25,000–30,000 people were left homeless. Much of San Salvador was submerged by flood waters of up to 8 ft (2.4 m) high, and even after their recession hundreds of homes remained buried under trees, debris, and 10 ft (3.0 m) of mud. In all, property damage from the storm amounted to $100 million (1982 US$) in the country; economic losses were estimated at $280 million (1982 USD). Crop damage was worth $250 million.

In Guatemala, widespread catastrophic floods claimed 615 lives and left 668 others missing. More than 10,000 people were left homeless as The 200 communities were isolated from surrounding areas. Overall, economic losses of $100 million (1982 USD) were reported in the country. In Nicaragua, Paul killed 71 people and caused $356 million (1982 USD) in economic losses. Throughout southern Mexico, floods from the precursor depression to Paul killed another 225 people. Prior to landfall in the state of Baja California Sur, 50,000 people were evacuated. Furthermore, wind gusts estimated at 120 mph (195 km/h) swept through San José del Cabo, causing property damage and subsequently leaving 9,000 homeless. Despite extensive damage, no deaths were reported in the Baja California Peninsula wake of Paul. In northern Mexico, the greatest damage occurred 70 miles (110 km) south of Los Mochis in the city of Guamuchil; a total of 24 people were killed by the storm statewide, although it produced beneficial rains over the region. Agricultural damage was severe in the state of Sinaloa, with up to 40 percent of the soybean crop destroyed. In all, the state's corn production was down by 26 percent from the previous year. Total storm damage in Mexico amounted to $4.5 billion (1982 MXN; $70 million USD). The remnants of Paul moved into the United States, producing heavy rainfall in southern New Mexico and extreme West Texas. Inclement weather was observed as far inland as the Great Plains.

=== Tropical Storm Rosa ===
- Tropical storm (SSHWS)
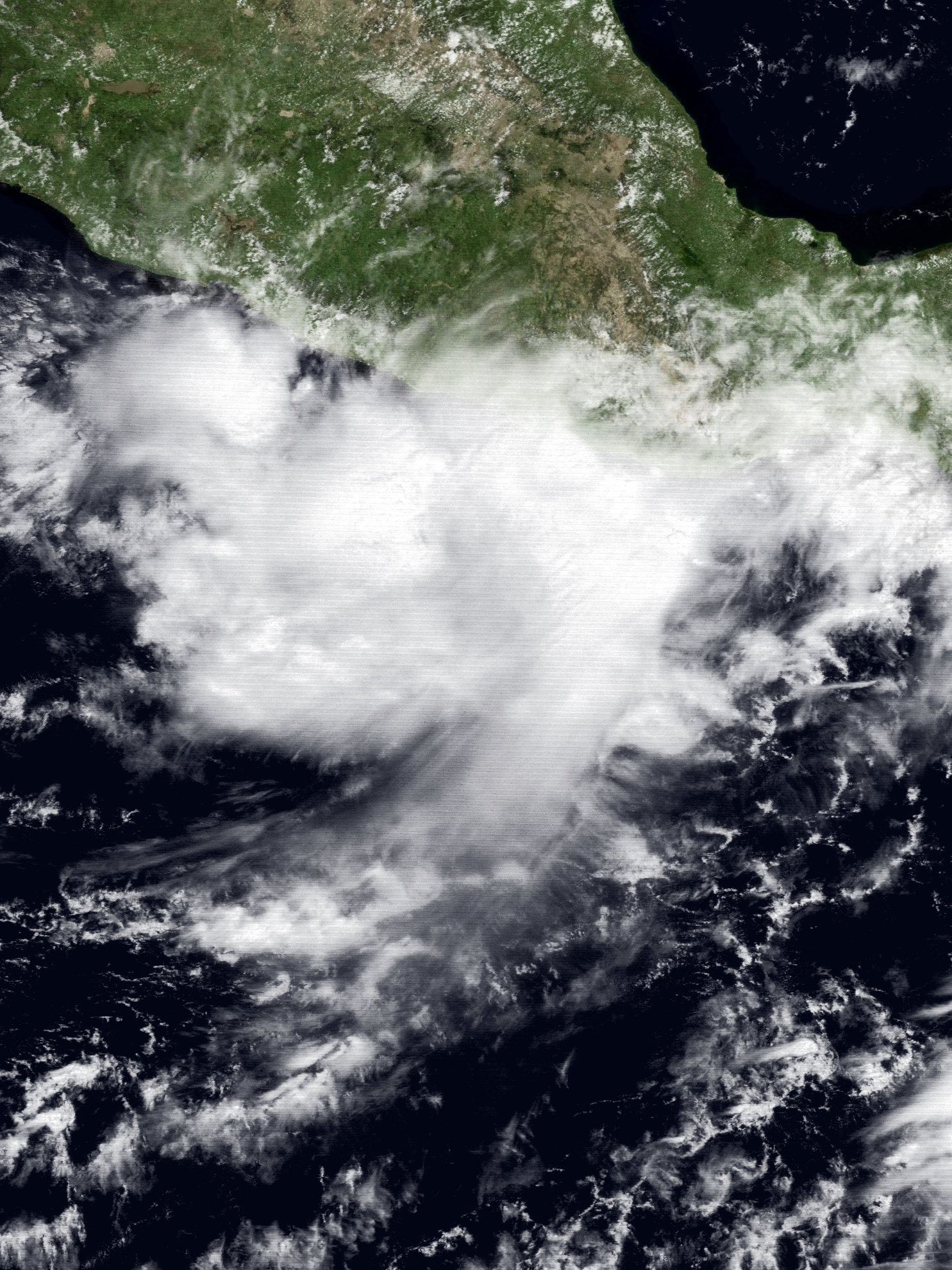
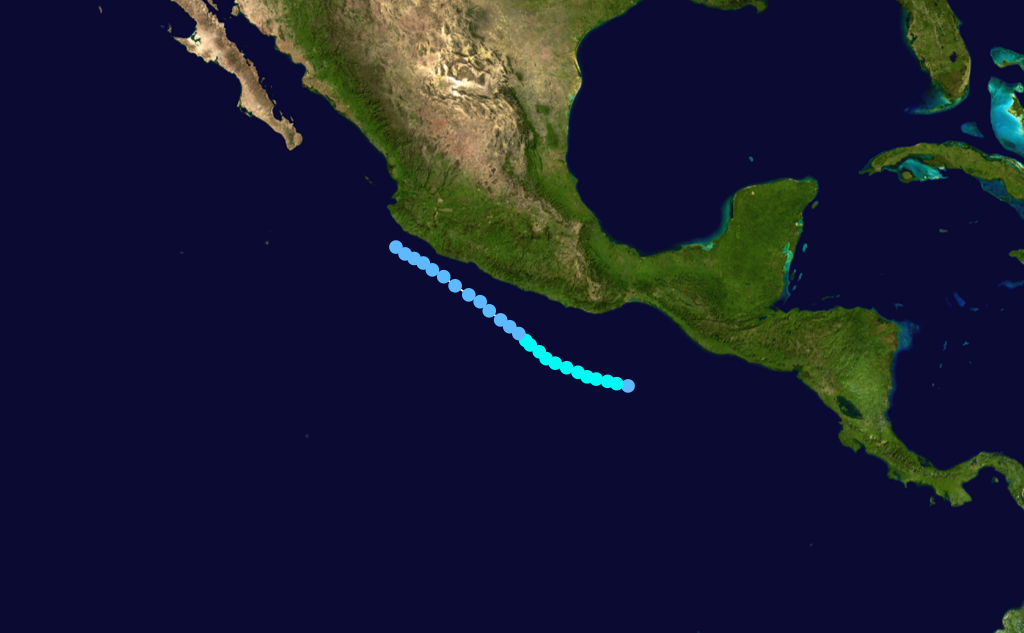
- Duration: September 30 – October 6
- Peak intensity: 50 mph (85 km/h) (1-min);

A well-organized tropical depression formed in the Gulf of Tehuantepec on September 30. Moving slowly northwest, the system became a tropical storm, reaching maximum sustained winds of 50 mph (80 km/h) on the afternoon of October 2. The system slowly weakened as it moved northwest, and Rosa brushed the Pacific coast of Mexico as a dissipating depression.

=== Hurricane Sergio ===
- Category 3 hurricane (SSHWS)
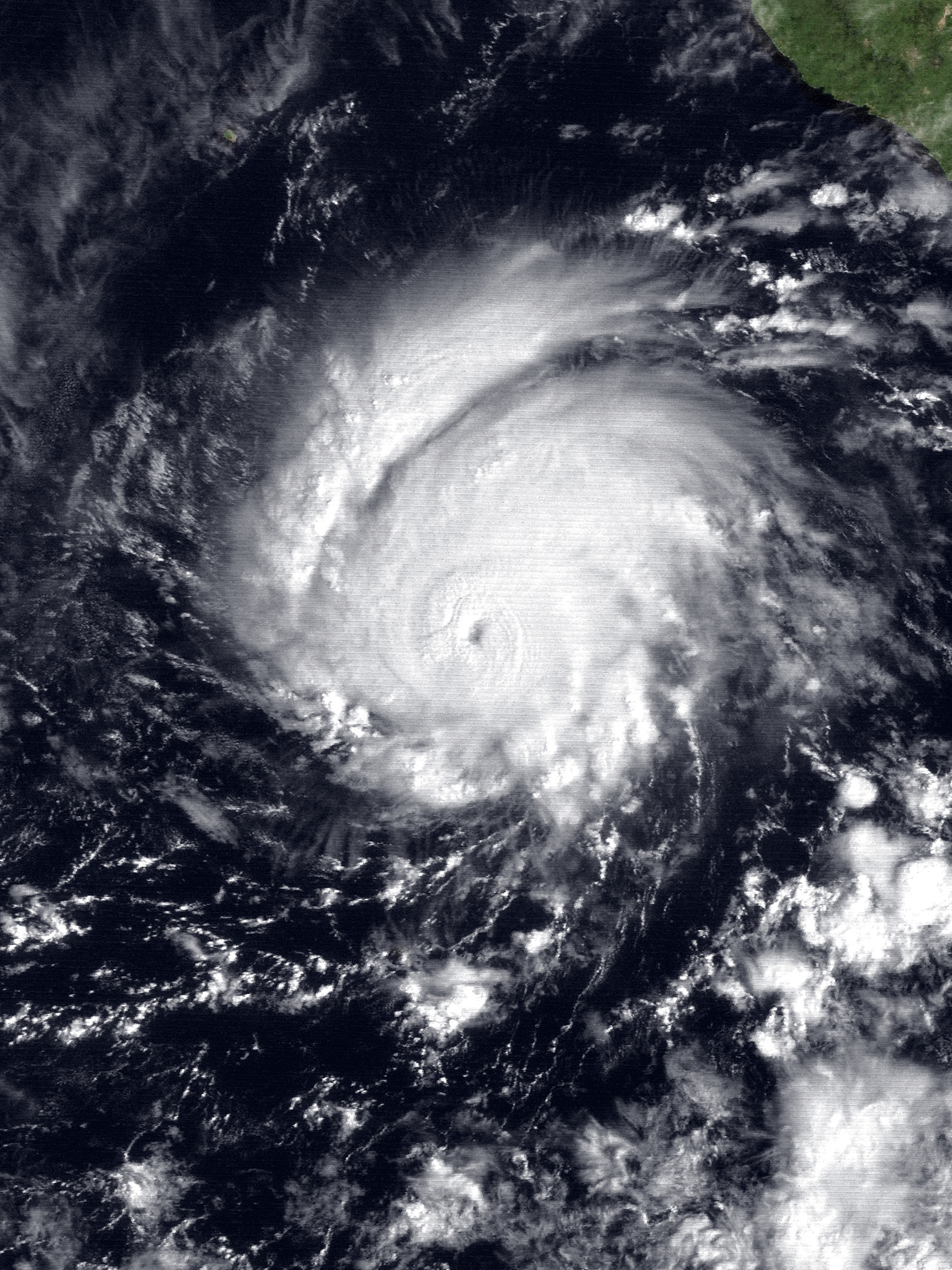
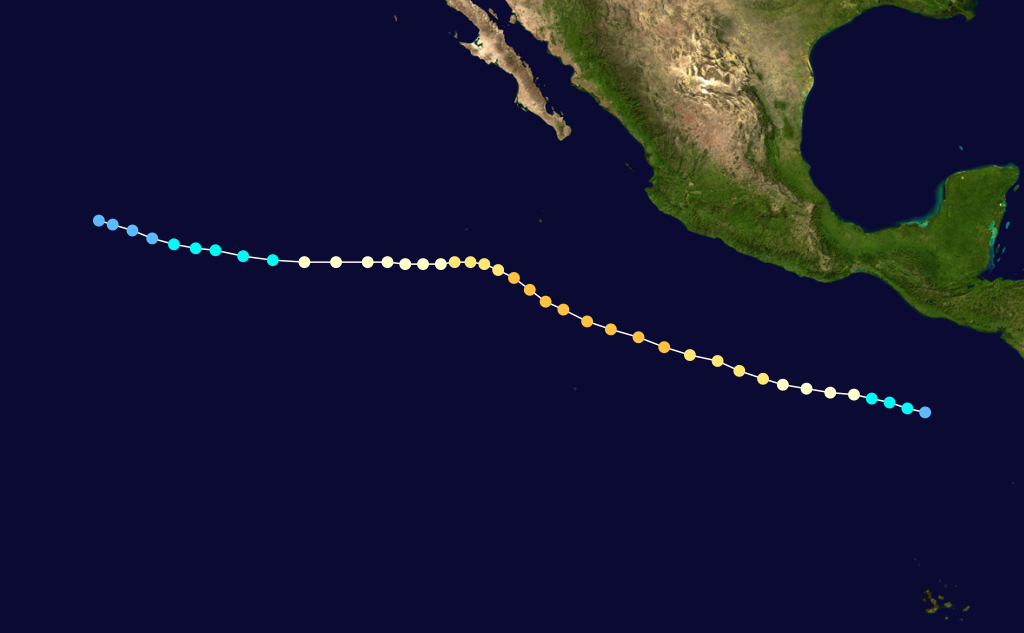
- Duration: October 14 – October 23
- Peak intensity: 125 mph (205 km/h) (1-min);

A tropical disturbance was noted southwest of Costa Rica on October 12. Moving west-northwest, the system organized into a tropical depression as it crossed the 91st meridian west late on October 13 and became a tropical storm by October 14 as it entered the Gulf of Tehuantepec. It strengthened into a hurricane late that day as it passed 95°W. By the afternoon of October 17, Sergio was packing sustained winds of 120 mph (190 km/h). Cooler water was reached soon afterwards, and weakening commenced. While slowly moving west, Sergio weakened to a tropical storm by the afternoon of October 21 and to a tropical depression late on October 22. The system dissipated near 19°N 133°W on the afternoon of October 23.

=== Tropical Storm Tara ===
- Tropical storm (SSHWS)
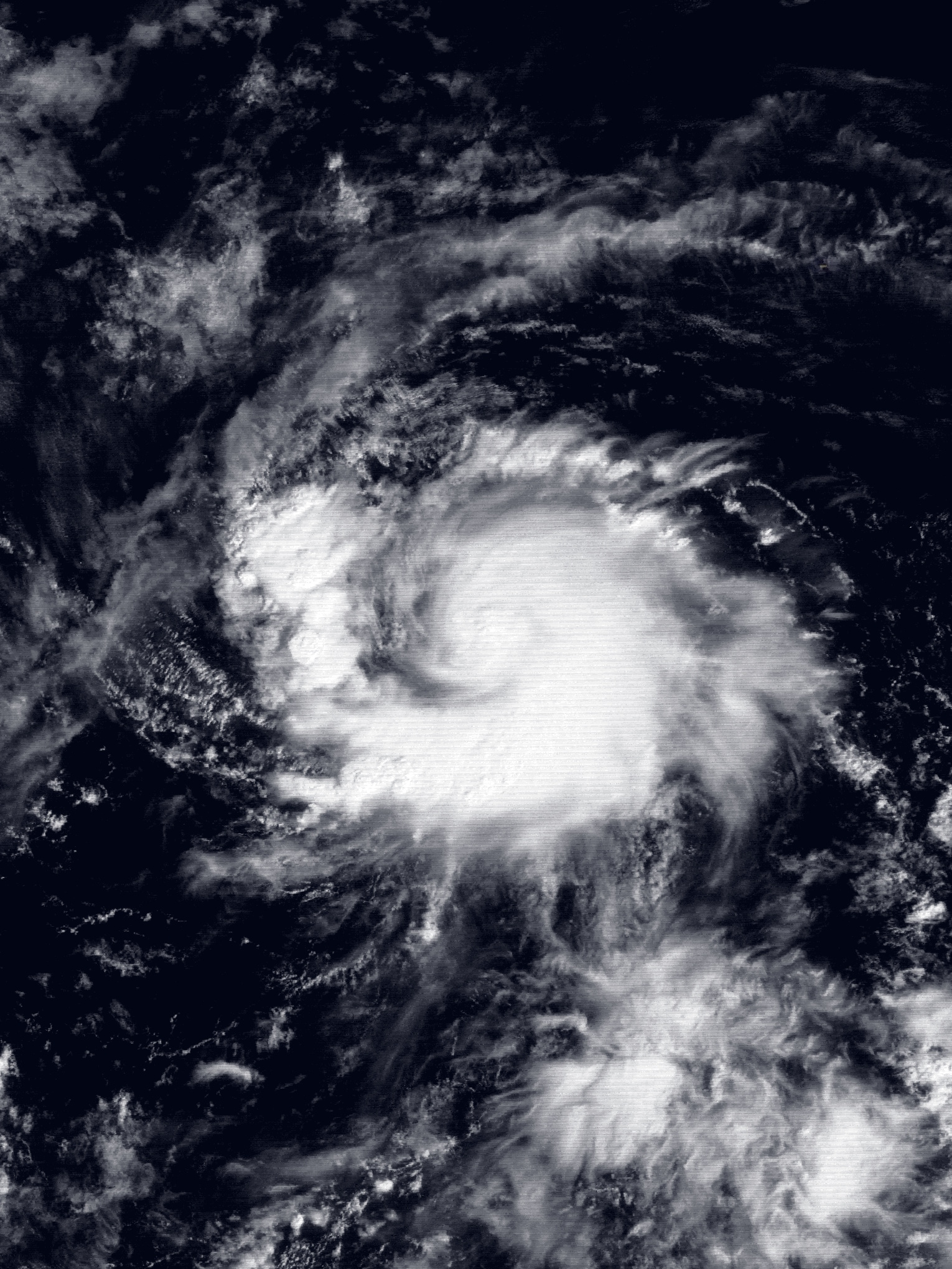
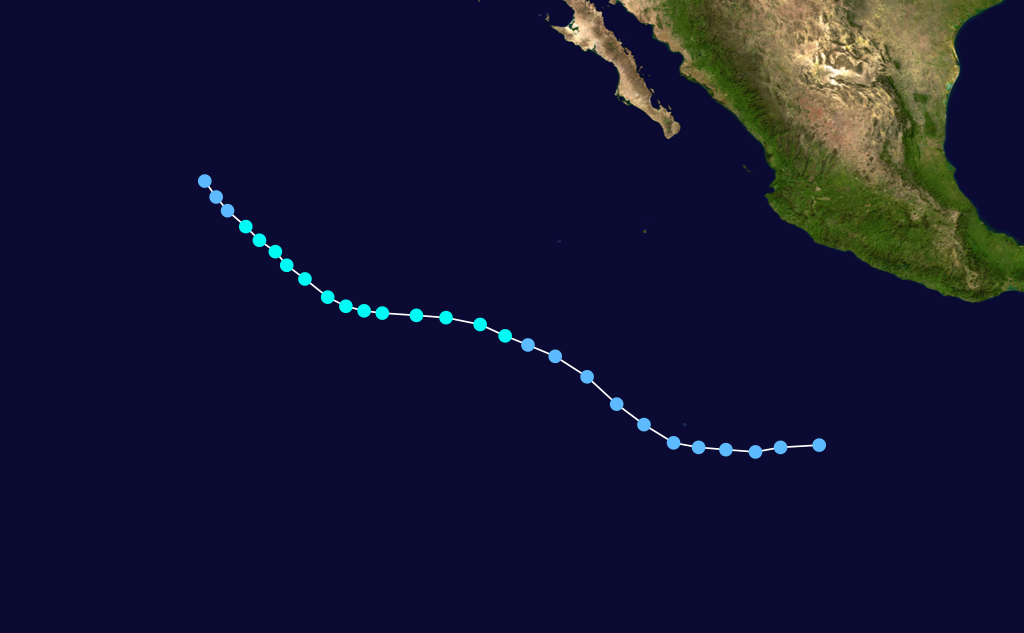
- Duration: October 19 – October 26
- Peak intensity: 50 mph (85 km/h) (1-min);

A tropical disturbance emerged off the coast of Central America. Cyclonic turning was noted on the afternoon of October 19, and a tropical depression formed 350 miles (560 km) south of Acapulco. Staggering west-northwestward, the cyclone became a tropical storm by the morning of the October 22. Maximum sustained winds increased to 50 mph (80 km/h) late on October 24. As it moved over cooler waters on October 25, the system weakened to a tropical depression that afternoon, dissipating that night near 21°N 130°W.

=== Hurricane Iwa ===
- Category 1 hurricane (SSHWS)
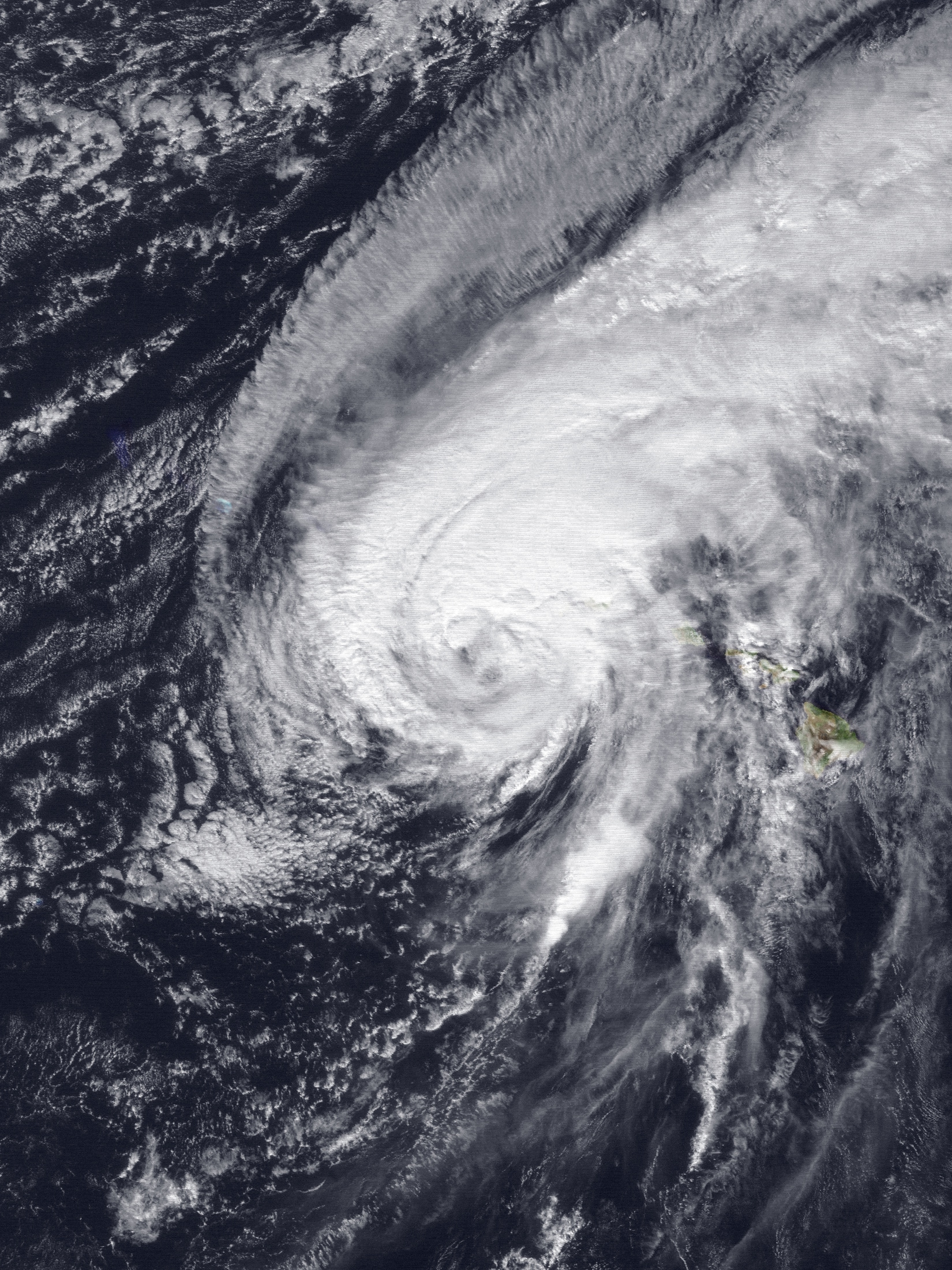
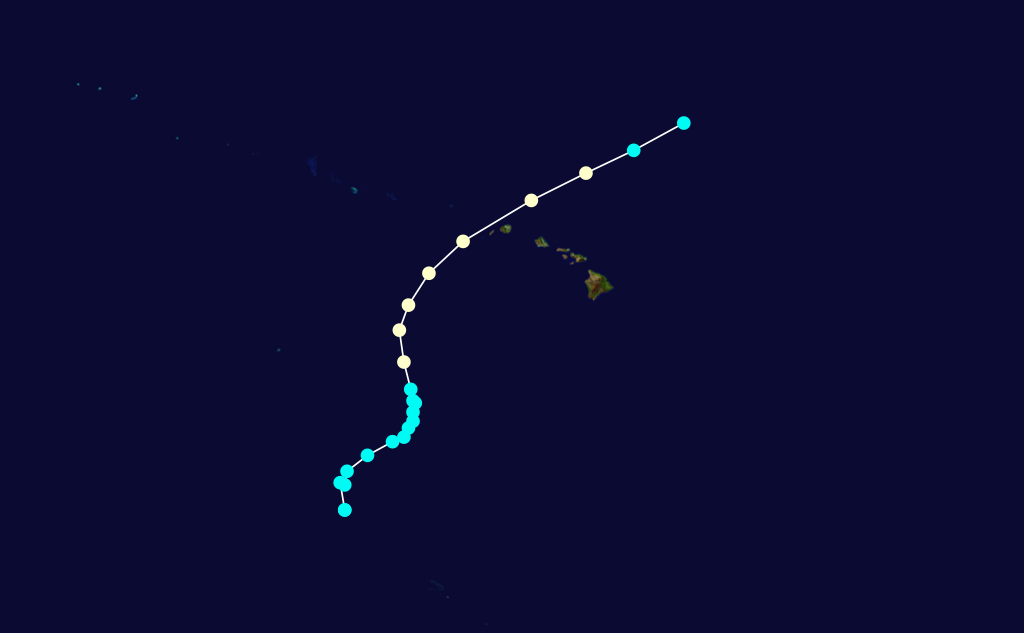
- Duration: November 19 – November 25
- Peak intensity: 90 mph (150 km/h) (1-min); 968 mbar (hPa)

A late-season trough of low pressure developed into a tropical depression and was subsequently upgraded into Tropical Storm Iwa. At first, the After turning to the northeast, Iwa began to slowly intensify, and on November 23, Iwa strengthened into a hurricane. Iwa reached peak winds of 90 mph (145 km/h) late on November 23. Accelerating, Iwa passed just north of the island of Kauai on November 24. After passing the island group, Iwa rapidly deteriorated; late on November 24, the hurricane degenerated into a tropical storm. On November 25, Iwa became an extratropical cyclone.

Due to the hurricane's rapid motion, storm surge extended 900 feet (275 m) inland. A total of 5,800 people were evacuated in Kauai. In addition, 44 of the 45 boats at Port Allen sunk. The worst of the damage from the hurricane occurred in Poipu and in areas where there was no protective barrier reef offshore. High winds from Hurricane Iwa briefly left Kauai without power and destroyed most papaya and banyan trees. The hurricane destroyed or damaged 3,890 homes on the island. Rough seas killed a person and left four others injured in Pearl Harbor. In Oahu, damage was heaviest on the southwest side of the island. The passage of the hurricane damaged at least 6,391 homes and 21 hotels; 418 buildings, including 30 businesses, were destroyed on Oahu. In Niihau, 20 homes were destroyed and 160 were damaged.

Throughout the Hawaiian island group, 20 people were treated for injuries. An estimated 500 people throughout Hawaii were left homeless due to the hurricane. At the time, Hurricane Iwa was the costliest storm to hit the state, with damage totaling $312 million (1982 USD, $1.04 billion 2025 USD). Three days after Hurricane Iwa passed the state, Governor George Ariyoshi declared the islands of Kauai and Niihau as disaster areas with President Ronald Reagan following suit on November 28, declaring Kauai, Niihau, and Oahu as disaster areas. Furthermore, two people died in a traffic accident due to malfunctioning traffic lights. Ten years following the storm, Hurricane Iniki struck the same area.

== Storm names ==
The following list of names was used for named storms that formed in the North Pacific Ocean east of 140°W in 1982. This is the same list used for the 1978 season except for Fabio, which replaced Fico. A storm was named Fabio for the first time in 1982. No names were retired from this list following the season. In 1982, two new sets of male/female names were added to the four existing sets, with the six lists to be used in rotation and re-cycled every six years. Consequently, the 1982 set was next used (expanded to include "X", "Y", and "Z" names) for the 1988 season.

- Aletta
- Bud
- Carlotta
- Daniel *
- Emilia *
- Fabio
- Gilma *
- Hector
- Iva
- John *
- Kristy *
- Lane *
- Miriam *
- Norman
- Olivia
- Paul
- Rosa
- Sergio
- Tara
- Vicente (unused)
- Willa (unused)

For storms that form in the North Pacific from 140°W to the International Date Line, names come from a series of four lists. The names, derived from the Hawaiian language, are used one after the other without regard to year, and when the bottom of one list is reached, the next named storm receives the name at the top of the next list. The 1982 season was the first in which the Central Pacific Hurricane Center assigned names under this system. Four named storms, listed below, formed in the central North Pacific in 1982. Named storms in the table above that crossed into the area during the year are noted (*).

- Akoni
- Ema
- Hana
- Iwa

=== Retirement ===
The name Iwa was retired from the central Pacific lists by the World Meteorological Organization after the 1982 season on account of the destruction it caused. It was replaced with Io, which was changed to Iona in 2007, before being used.

== Season effects ==
1982 Pacific hurricane season statistics
| Storm name | Dates active | Storm category at peak intensity | Max 1-min wind mph (km/h) | Min. press. (mbar) | Areas affected | Damage (US$) | Deaths | Ref(s). |
|---|---|---|---|---|---|---|---|---|
| Aletta | May 20-29 | Tropical storm | 65 (100) | Unknown | None | None | None | |
| Two-E | May 31-June 4 | Tropical depression | 35 (55) | Unknown | None | None | None | |
| Three-E | June 13-15 | Tropical depression | 30 (45) | Unknown | None | None | None | |
| Bud | June 15-17 | Tropical storm | 50 (85) | Unknown | None | None | None | |
| Five-E | June 17-19 | Tropical depression | 35 (55) | Unknown | Southwestern Mexico, Central America | None | None | |
| Carlotta | July 1-6 | Tropical storm | 60 (95) | Unknown | None | None | None | |
| Seven-E | July 3 | Tropical depression | 35 (55) | Unknown | None | None | None | |
| Daniel | July 7-22 | Category 3 hurricane | 115 (185) | Unknown | Hawaii | None | None | |
| Emilia | July 12-15 | Tropical storm | 65 (100) | Unknown | None | None | None | |
| Ten-E | July 13-14 | Tropical depression | 35 (55) | Unknown | None | None | None | |
| Eleven-E | July 15-17 | Tropical depression | 35 (55) | Unknown | None | None | None | |
| Fabio | July 17-25 | Category 1 hurricane | 80 (130) | Unknown | Socorro Island | None | None | |
| Gilma | July 26-August 2 | Category 3 hurricane | 125 (205) | Unknown | Hawaii | None | None | |
| Hector | July 29-August 3 | Category 1 hurricane | 75 (120) | Unknown | None | None | None | |
| Iva | August 1-8 | Tropical storm | 40 (65) | Unknown | None | None | None | |
| John | August 2-11 | Category 3 hurricane | 115 (185) | Unknown | None | None | None | |
| Kristy | August 8-17 | Category 1 hurricane | 90 (150) | Unknown | Hawaii | None | None | |
| Lane | August 8-15 | Tropical storm | 65 (100) | Unknown | None | None | None | |
| Miriam | August 30-September 6 | Category 1 hurricane | 85 (140) | Unknown | None | None | None | |
| Akoni | August 30-September 2 | Tropical storm | 50 (85) | Unknown | None | None | None | |
| Norman | September 9-18 | Category 2 hurricane | 105 (165) | Unknown | Baja California, Southwestern United States | None | None | |
| Twenty-One E | September 10-12 | Tropical depression | 35 (55) | Unknown | None | None | None | |
| Ema | September 15-19 | Tropical storm | 45 (75) | Unknown | None | None | None | |
| Hana | September 15-19 | Tropical storm | 45 (75) | Unknown | None | None | None | |
| Olivia | September 18-25 | Category 4 hurricane | 145 (230) | Unknown | Revillagigedo Islands, California, Western United States, Southwestern Canada | $475 million | 0 (3) | |
| Paul | September 18-30 | Category 2 hurricane | 110 (175) | Unknown | Guatemala, El Salvador, Baja California, Northwest Mexico, United States | $520 million | 1,625 | |
| Rosa | September 30-October 6 | Tropical storm | 50 (85) | Unknown | Western Mexico | None | None | |
| Sergio | October 14-23 | Category 3 hurricane | 125 (205) | Unknown | None | None | None | |
| Tara | October 19-26 | Tropical storm | 50 (85) | Unknown | None | None | None | |
| Iwa | November 19-25 | Category 1 hurricane | 90 (150) | 968 | Hawaii | $312 million | 1 (3) | |
Season aggregates
| 30 systems | May 20-November 25 | | 145 (230) | Unknown | | $1.307 billion | 1,632 | |

== See also ==
- List of Pacific hurricanes
- Pacific hurricane season
- 1982 Atlantic hurricane season
- 1982 Pacific typhoon season
- 1982 North Indian Ocean cyclone season
- Australian cyclone seasons: 1981–82, 1982–83
- South Pacific cyclone seasons: 1981–82, 1982–83
- South-West Indian Ocean cyclone seasons: 1981–82, 1982–83
- Southern Hemisphere tropical cyclone seasons: 1981–82, 1982–83
