= Recharge oscillator =

Theory of sea surface temperature

The recharge oscillator model for El Niño–Southern Oscillation (ENSO) is a theory described for the first time in 1997 by Jin., which explains the periodical variation of the sea surface temperature (SST) and thermocline depth that occurs in the central equatorial Pacific Ocean. The physical mechanisms at the basis of this oscillation are periodical recharges and discharges of the zonal mean equatorial heat content, due to ocean-atmosphere interaction. Other theories have been proposed to model ENSO, such as the delayed oscillator, the western Pacific oscillator and the advective reflective oscillator. A unified and consistent model has been proposed by Wang in 2001, in which the recharge oscillator model is included as a particular case.

== Historical Development ==
The first attempts to model ENSO were made by Bjerknes in 1969, who understood that ENSO is the result of an ocean-atmosphere interaction (Bjerknes feedback). In 1975 an important step in ENSO comprehension was made by Wyrtki, who improved the Bjerknes model realising that the warm water build-up in the western Pacific is due to a strengthening in the trade winds, and that an El Niño event is triggered by the warm water flow eastward in form of Kelvin waves. Although the Bjerknes-Wyrtki model explained the causes that trigger El Niño events, it was not able to deal with the cyclic nature of the whole ENSO. The recurring nature of the ENSO was introduced by Cane and Zebiak in 1985, who understood that as a result of El Niño event the thermocline depth at the equator is shallower than normal. This condition causes the switch to the cold phase, also referred as La Niña phase. The model proposed by Cane and Zebiak was the first to take into account the coupled interaction of ocean-atmosphere and the ocean-memory system. These two assumptions are the foundation of the model described by Jin in 1997, the recharge oscillator.

== A qualitative explanation of the model ==
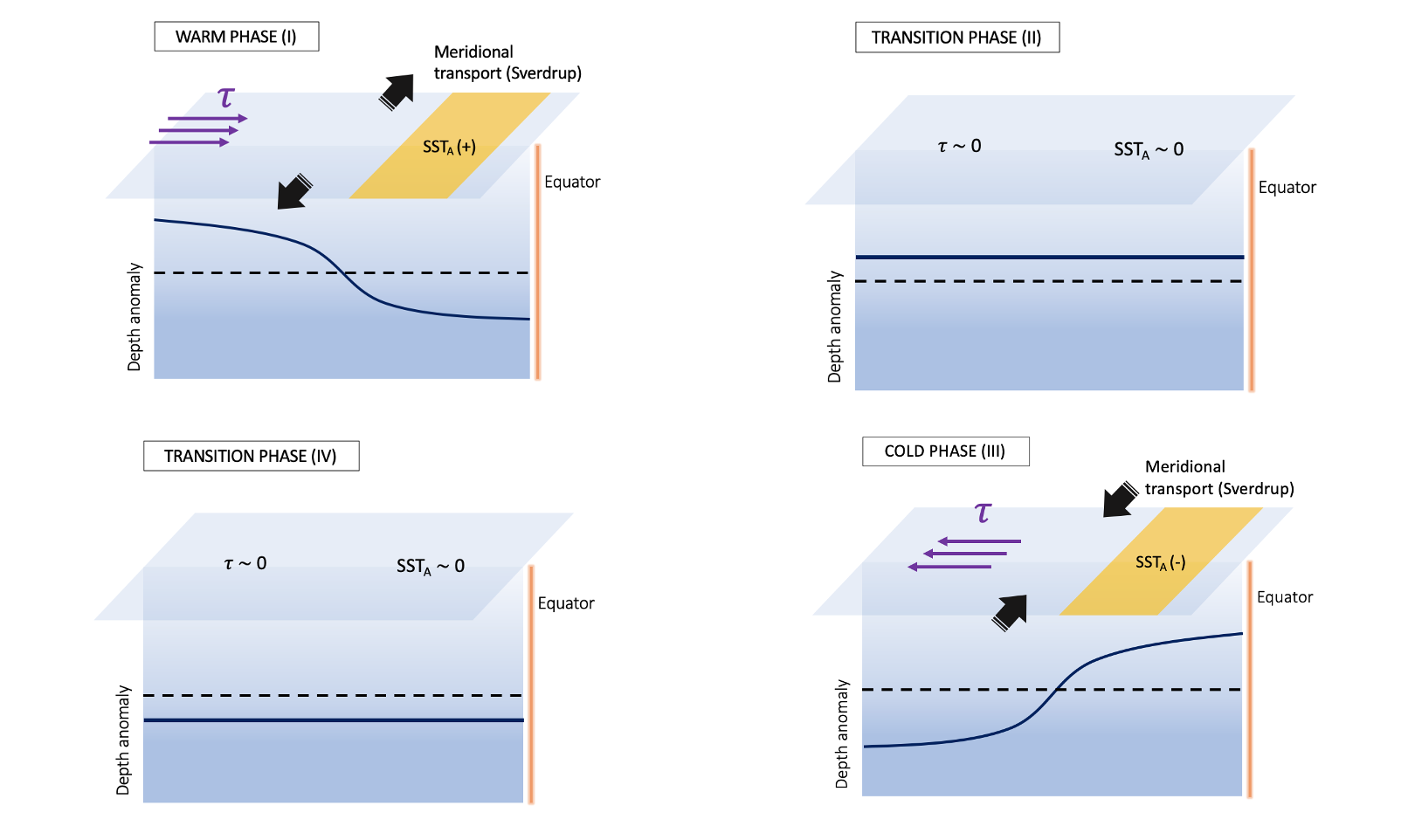
The figure describes the four different phases of the model. Note that the thick blue line represents the thermocline depth anomaly (not the thermocline). $\tau$ is the wind stress anomaly.

The physics processes behind the recharge oscillator model can be divided into 4 different phases:

1. Warm phase: a positive warm anomaly in SST situated in the eastern part of the Pacific ocean induces westerly wind anomalies, causing a weakening of the Walker circulation. This results in an anomaly of the equatorial thermocline slope, which compared to the unperturbed situation is now deeper in the eastern part of the Pacific. The thermocline slope anomaly amplifies the wind stress anomaly and, therefore, the anomaly in the SST, creating a positive feedback (since wind stress anomaly is driven by SST anomaly as well). The wind stress gradually reduces the thermocline depth in the western Pacific and leads to a negative zonal mean thermocline depth across the Pacific, due to the divergence of zonal integrated Sverdrup transport. This heat discharge gradually reduces the thermocline depth also in the eastern Pacific, where it leads to a cooling trend for the SST anomaly. This phase is referred to El Niño, and is usually associated with a higher temperature in the western part of the Pacific ocean and an increased risk of droughts and fire danger in Australia.
2. First Transition Phase: In this phase the SST temperature anomaly has cooled to zero. Therefore, also the wind stress anomaly, which was caused by the SST anomaly, vanishes. As a consequence, the thermocline tilt between the eastern and the western parts of the basin will also decrease, because its unbalance is due to the wind stress. In this period the whole equatorial Pacific thermocline depth is anomalously shallow, since the heat content in the ocean basin was removed by the Sverdrup transport.
3. Cooling phase: The reduced depth of the thermocline layer allows anomalous cold water to be pumped into the eastern surface layer by climatological upwelling, which causes the SST anomaly to slide into a negative phase in that part of the Pacific ocean. The SST anomaly in the eastern basin will strengthen the Walker circulation winds, amplifying the thermocline tilt; as a result the thermocline depth anomaly will be increased in the western part of the Pacific ocean and reduced in its eastern part. The tilt increase will induce a growth in the negative SST anomaly, resulting in a feedback similar to the warm phase, but with an opposite effect. This phase is referred to La Niña, and it is characterised by greater evaporation of western Pacific waters, more frequent rainfalls and floods across Australia
4. Second Transition Phase: The enhanced Walker circulation increases the wind stress in the west direction, enlarging the heat import in the equatorial basin due to the Sverdrup transport. This heat introduction deepens the mean thermocline depth over the equatorial Pacific, resulting in a reduction of the SST anomaly. When the SST anomaly is reduced to zero, the positive zonal mean thermocline will lead to a positive SST anomaly in the eastern part of the basin, triggering the begin of a new cycle.

== Recharge oscillator models ==
=== Idealised recharge oscillator model ===
The idealised non-dimensional theory that has been proposed by Jin in 1997 to explain ENSO consists of the mathematical structure described below. It relies on modelling the western and eastern part of the Pacific Ocean as two pools. The assumptions and equations behind the model are explained below.

The thermocline depth anomaly in the eastern part of the basin $h_{E}$ is directly and instantaneously related to the anomaly in the western part $h_{W}$ and to the wind stress anomaly $\tau$, according to the relation

$$h_{E}=h_{W}+\tau$$.

The thermocline depth anomaly changes over the western equatorial Pacific are mathematically described by the equation

$$\frac{dh_{W}}{dt}=-rh_{W}-F_{\tau}$$

where $-rh_{W}$ represents the ocean adjustment, characterised by a damping process rate $r$ due to the mixing and equatorial energy loss to the boundary layer currents, which occur at the eastern and western side of the basin. The second term $-F_{\tau}$ represents the Sverdrup transport across the basin, or equally the heat transport into or out of the basin; Sverdrup transport depends on the wind stress curl $\nabla\times\tau$. Since $F_{\tau}$ is directly proportional to zonally integrated wind stress and its curl, it is possible to approximate $F_{\tau}=\alpha \tau$, where $\alpha$ is a constant. The minus sign in the equation above is due to the fact that a westerly wind stress reduces the thermocline depth in the western basin, while an enforced trade wind (whose direction is always east to west) increases the thermocline depth.

The previous equations provide a simplified description of the basinwide equatorial oceanic adjustment under the anomalous wind stress forcing.

The SST anomaly $T_{E}$ evolution in time is described by the relation

$$\frac{dT_{E}}{dt} = -cT_{E}+\gamma h_{E} + \delta_{s} \tau_{E}$$

where $-cT_{E}$ represents the SST relaxation due to the $c$ rate damping processes, $+ \gamma h_{E}$ is taking account of the climatological upwelling, and $+\delta_{s} \tau_{E}$ represents the advective feedback. $\tau_{E}$ is the wind stress averaged over the region where the SST occurs, $\gamma$ and $\delta_{s}$ are respectively the thermocline and the Ekman pumping feedback coefficients.

As explained in the previous section, the atmospheric response to a SST anomaly is an increased wind stress $\tau$, whose orientation depends on anomaly's sign. The wind stress anomaly magnitude is influenced by the zonal area where the SST is averaged, and results bigger if all the basin is taken into account, rather than just its eastern part. This observation allows to approximate the relation between $\tau$, $\tau_{E}$ and $T_{E}$:

$$\tau = b T_{E}, \tau_{E} = b'T_{E}$$

with $b,b'$ coupling coefficients.

From the previous equations it is possible to derive a linear coupled system, which describes the thermocline depth and the SST anomaly time evolution in the eastern side of the basin:

$$\frac{dh_{W}}{dt}=-rh_{W}-\alpha b T_{E}$$

$$\frac{dT_{E}}{dt} = RT_{E}+\gamma h_{W}$$

where $R$ is initially defined as the sum of the already introduced constants $\gamma b, \delta_{s}b'$ and $-c$, and describes the Bjerknes' positive feedback hypothesis. As already stated $\gamma b$ represents the thermocline feedback, $\delta_{s}b'$ the Ekman upwelling, and $-c$ the rate of the damping process. Because of the weak local wind stress averaged over the eastern basin, the Ekman upwelling feedback parameter $\delta_{s}b'$ is negligible when compared to the other two terms, ultimately leading to $R = \gamma b -c$.

=== Improved physical approach ===
The model presented above is still highly idealised. There is a similar approach which investigates the same climatological anomalies in the Walker circulation along with ocean surface-layer thickness anomalies, but with a more physical perspective.

The key processes of this recharge-oscillator model still involve the ocean (dynamics, volume conservation and heat budget) and the atmosphere, thus leading to another coupled model that comprehensively describes the mechanism of the different phases of ENSO. The assumptions are slightly different from those of the model described above.

The contribution from the ocean is updated to be that of a reduced-gravity surface layer with an average thickness $H$. Following a similar approach as described above, given the wind stress anomaly $\tau$ and one thermocline depth anomaly (for instance $h_{W}$) it is possible to know the other depth anomaly ($h_{E}$) through the relation:

$$g'\frac{h_E-h_W}{L}=\frac{\tau}{\rho_0H}$$

where $g'$ is the reduced gravity $g'= g \frac{\Delta \rho}{\rho_0}$. By imposing the volume conservation it is possible to see that the only transport that can exist is a meridional transport. This is accomplished through the Sverdrup transport induced by the wind stress anomaly.

The vertical integrated North-South velocity is then:

$$V_{TOT}=\frac{1}{\rho_0\beta_0}
(\frac{\partial\tau^y}{\partial x} - \frac{\partial\tau^x}{\partial y})$$.

Nevertheless, in this model we can consider no wind stress anomaly in the meridional direction, leading to a final integrated transport:

$$V_{TOT}=-\frac{1}{\rho_0\beta_0}
\frac{\partial\tau^x}{\partial y}$$.

The wind anomaly is limited in space, and decreases away from the equator; its limit are set by the equatorial Rossby radius of deformation $R_{EQ}$, that at the equator assumes a value slightly higher than 200 Km. Therefore, the wind anomaly is considered to be maximum at the equator and to reach $\tau = 0$ over the limits $\pm R_{EQ}$ and beyond them. By virtue of this consideration the meridional integrated transport and the corresponding flow divergence $D$ can be calculated as:

$$V_{TOT}=\pm\frac{1}{\rho_0\beta_0}
\frac{\tau}{ R_{EQ}} ; \ \ \ \ \ D\sim \frac{\tau}{\rho_0\beta_0 R_{EQ}^2}$$

where the $\pm$ sign in the total flow refers to the northern boundary ($+$) and the southern boundary ($-$).

On the basis of what has just been described, the understanding and the inclusion of the ocean dynamics contribution is completed, and it is therefore possible to estimate the total change in the western thermocline depth as:

$$\frac{dh_W}{dt}= -D - rh_W$$

where the second contribution on the right-hand is due to the ocean adjustment damping relative to boundary layer and lateral processes.

Further considerations can be made about the ocean heat budget. The heat budget is considered to be open only when a temperature anomaly appears on the eastern side of the ocean. In order for the temperature in the eastern Pacific to change, both a zonal velocity anomaly due to wind stress anomaly and vertical advection are needed.

In the first case, the horizontal velocity of heat transporting flow can be considered to be proportional to the wind stress anomaly as: $U=\gamma\tau$. This relation is valid as long as the basin taken into consideration is assumed to be purely wind-driven and not influenced by Earth rotation. Positive $U$ values correspond to positive wind stress anomaly values.

Thereby, the temperature anomaly along the eastern Pacific (advection of the background climatological temperature field) can be seen as:

$$-u\frac{\partial T}{\partial x} \sim U \frac{\Delta_hT}{L}$$

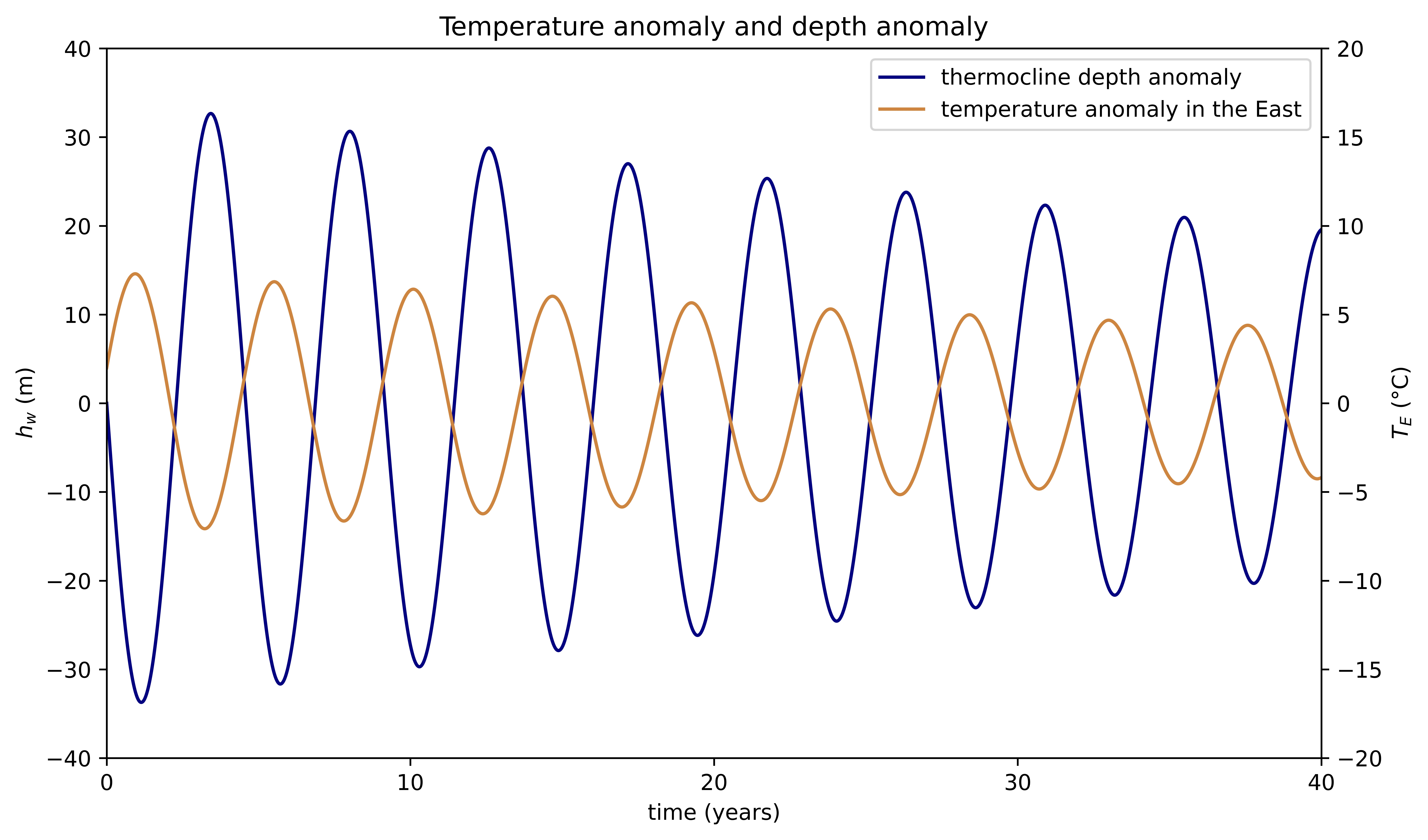
The figure shows the simulation of the oscillation of temperature anomaly and thermocline depth anomaly over a 40 years period of time. The amplitude of the oscillations decline with time due to damping effects included in the model. Starting conditions (T=2 °C, h_{W}=0).

where $\Delta_hT$ is the difference in temperature between the eastern and the western parts of the basin.

As far as convection is concerned, the vertical convection in the East can be normally estimated as

$$-u\frac{\partial \bar{T}}{\partial z}\sim - \bar{\omega} \frac{\bar{T}_{SURF}-\bar{T}_{-H}}{H}$$

where the bar above the temperature refers to the climatological situation. In this case, $\omega$ refers to the upwelling and its relation with the wind stress can be parameterised as $\bar\omega = - \alpha \bar\tau$ , where the minus sign ensures that to a positive wind stress corresponds a decrease in the upwelling on the eastern pool. In fact, a positive wind stress anomaly generates a corresponding negative upwelling anomaly $\tilde\omega$. The resulting reduction of deep cold water generates a temperature anomaly and thus a positive heat flux calculated as:

$$- \tilde{\omega} \frac{T_{SURF}-T_{-H}}{H} \sim \alpha \tau \frac{\Delta_vT}{H}$$

where $\Delta_vT$ is the vertical temperature difference.

Since the surface water temperature is higher than the deep water temperature ($\Delta_vT > 0$), this contribution is positive for a positive wind stress anomaly.

Nonetheless, the downward shifting of the water temperature profile (the thermocline deepens by $h_E$) implies that the temperature at a depth $-H$ should be considered to be the climatological value found at $-H + h_E$. It is important to highlight that the surface temperature, at this point, includes the increase due to the anomaly.

Therefore, the following result is obtained:

$-\bar{\omega}(\frac{T_E}{z}-\frac{\partial \bar{T}}{\partial z} \frac{h_E}{H}) \sim - \frac{\bar{\omega}}{H} T_E + \frac{\bar{\omega}\Delta_vT}{H^2} h_E$.

The figure shows the simulation of relation between the temperature anomaly and the thermocline depth anomaly and how it changes over time. Same starting conditions as above.

Grouping the three contributions from advection, the variation over time of the temperature anomaly due to advection becomes:

$$\frac{dT_E}{dt}=-(r'+\frac{\bar\omega}{H}) + \frac{\bar\omega \Delta_vT}{H^2} h_E +(\gamma \frac{\Delta_hT}{L}+ \alpha \frac{\Delta_vT}{H})\tau$$.

In the final contribution, a damping component (first one on the right-hand side) is added in a similar way to what has been done above for $\frac{dh_W}{dt}$.

It is possible to further assume that the relation between the wind stress anomaly and the temperature anomaly is given by: $\tau = \mu T_E$ .

Finally, the coupled model is complete and described as follows:

$$\frac{dh_W}{dt}=-\frac{\mu T_E}{\rho_0\beta_0 R_{EQ}^2} - rh_W$$

$$\frac{dT_E}{dt}=[\mu(\gamma\frac{\Delta_hT}{L}+ \alpha \frac{\Delta_vT}{H}
+\frac{\bar\omega L \Delta_vT}{H^3 g' \rho_0}- r') - \frac{\bar\omega}{H}] T_E
+\frac{\bar\omega\Delta_vT}{H^2}h_W$$.

=== Comparison with real measurements ===
Despite the improvements, the previous model is still a simplification of the real mechanism that is much more complex in its behaviour. The animation clearly shows an elliptical behaviour over time in the relation between temperature and depth anomalies that is not observed in historical data observations. The model described above considers a symmetrical behaviour for the two different phases (El Niño and La Niña), which is not what is observed in reality. For instance, as shown in the work of McPhaden et al. (2000): "air–sea fluxes, which are a negative feedback on SST anomaly growth in the equatorial cold tongue are more effective at heating the ocean during cold phases of ENSO than they are at cooling the ocean during warm phases of ENSO. Alternately, the ability of upwelling and vertical mixing to cool the surface may saturate at some threshold beyond which further thermocline shoaling does not lead to further SST cooling". The predictibility of ENSO is enhanced when the influence of the Atlantic is taken into account, and this coupling of ENSO to the equatorial Atlantic can be include in an extended recharge oscillator model.

== Recent Developments ==
The recharge oscillator framework has been further developed to incorporate seasonal, nonlinear, and stochastic processes and to examine a wider range of ENSO behavior. A review of simple ENSO models by Jin et al. (2020) showed that the leading mode of ENSO variability in observations, intermediate-complexity models, and comprehensive climate models can be reduced to a recharge oscillator. Extensions of the framework can account for key properties of ENSO, including its amplitude, dominant timescale or periodicity, seasonal phase locking, and the amplitude asymmetry between El Niño and La Niña. A compherhensive review by Vialard et al. (2025) concluded that the recharge oscillator can quantitatively reproduce many of these key properties in observations and climate-model simulations, including ENSO amplitude, dominant timescale, seasonality, and warm–cold phase asymmetry. These developments have made the recharge oscillator a framework for diagnosing and comparing the physical processes that control ENSO behavior across observations and climate models.

The recharge oscillator framework has also been extended to investigate the ENSO predictibility. Zhao et al. (2024) introduced the '''eXtended nonlinear Recharge Oscillator (XRO)''', which incorporates the core ENSO recharge oscillator dynamics together with seasonally modulated interactions between ENSO and other major modes of climate variability in the global oceans. The XRO produced skillful ENSO forecasts at lead times of up to 16–18 months, outperforming global climate models and achieving skill comparable to the most skillful artificial-intelligence forecasting methods. The XRO also provided a physically interpretable framework for quantifying the contributions of other ocean climate modes to ENSO amplitude and predictability through their memory and interactions with ENSO.

== See also ==
- Vagn Walfrid Ekman
- Harald Sverdrup
