= Ocean dynamical thermostat =

Physical mechanism affecting sea surface temperatures in the Pacific Ocean

Ocean dynamical thermostat is a physical mechanism through which changes in the mean radiative forcing influence the gradients of sea surface temperatures in the Pacific Ocean and the strength of the Walker circulation. Increased radiative forcing (warming) is more effective in the western Pacific than in the eastern where the upwelling of cold water masses damps the temperature change. This increases the east-west temperature gradient and strengthens the Walker circulation. Decreased radiative forcing (cooling) has the opposite effect.

The process has been invoked to explain variations in the Pacific Ocean temperature gradients that correlate to insolation and climate variations. It may also be responsible for the hypothesized correlation between El Niño events and volcanic eruptions, and for changes in the temperature gradients that occurred during the 20th century. Whether the ocean dynamical thermostat controls the response of the Pacific Ocean to anthropogenic global warming is unclear, as there are competing processes at play; potentially, it could drive a La Niña-like climate tendency during initial warming before it is overridden by other processes.

== Background ==
The equatorial Pacific is a key region of Earth in terms of its relative influence on the worldwide atmospheric circulation. A characteristic east-west temperature gradient is coupled to an atmospheric circulation, the Walker circulation, and further controlled by atmospheric and oceanic dynamics. The western Pacific features the so-called "warm pool", where the warmest sea surface temperatures (SSTs) of Earth are found. In the eastern Pacific conversely an area called the "cold tongue" is always colder than the warm pool even though they lie at the same latitude, as cold water is upwelled there. The temperature gradient between the two in turn induces an atmospheric circulation, the Walker circulation, which responds strongly to the SST gradient.

One important component of the climate is the El Niño-Southern Oscillation (ENSO), a mode of climate variability. During its positive/El Niño phase, waters in the central and eastern Pacific are warmer than normal while during its cold/La Niña they are colder than normal. Coupled to these SST changes the atmospheric pressure difference between the eastern and western Pacific changes. ENSO and Walker circulation variations have worldwide effects on weather, including natural disasters such as bushfires, droughts, floods and tropical cyclone activity. The atmospheric circulation modulates the heat uptake by the ocean, the strength and position of the Intertropical Convergence Zone (ITCZ), tropical precipitation and the strength of the Indian monsoon.

== Original hypothesis by Clement et al.(1996) and Sun and Liu's (1996) precedent ==
Already in May 1996 Sun and Liu published a hypothesis that coupled interactions between ocean winds, the ocean surface and ocean currents can limit water temperatures in the western Pacific. As part of that study, they found that increased equilibrium temperatures drive an increased temperature gradient between the eastern and western Pacific.

The ocean dynamical thermostat mechanism was described in a dedicated publication by Clement et al. 1996 in a coupled ocean-atmosphere model of the equatorial ocean. Since in the western Pacific SSTs are only governed by stored heat and heat fluxes, while in the eastern Pacific the horizontal and vertical advection also play a role. Thus an imposed source of heating primarily warms the western Pacific, inducing stronger easterly winds that facilitate upwelling in the eastern Pacific and cool its temperature - a pattern opposite that expected from the heating. Cold water upwelled along the equator then spreads away from it, reducing the total warming of the basin. The temperature gradient between the western and eastern Pacific thus increases, strengthening the trade winds and further increasing upwelling; this eventually results in a climate state resembling La Niña. The mechanism is seasonal as upwelling is least effective in boreal spring and most effective in boreal autumn; thus it is mainly operative in autumn. Due to the vertical temperature structure, ENSO variability becomes more regular during cooling by the thermostat mechanism, but is damped during warming.

The model of Clement et al. 1996 only considers temperature anomalies and does not account for the entire energy budget. After some time, warming would spread to the source regions of the upwelled water and in the thermocline, eventually damping the thermostat. The principal flaw in the model is that it assumes that the temperature of the upwelled water does not change over time.

== Later research ==
Later studies have verified the ocean dynamical thermostat mechanism for a number of climate models with different structures of warming and also the occurrence of the opposite response - a decline in the SST gradient - in response to climate cooling. In fully coupled models a tendency of the atmospheric circulation to intensify with decreasing insolation sometimes negates the thermostat response to decreased solar activity. Liu, Lu and Xie 2015 proposed that an ocean dynamical thermostat can also operate in the Indian Ocean, and the concept has been extended to cover the Indo-Pacific as a whole rather than just the equatorial Pacific.

Water flows from the western Pacific into the Indian Ocean through straits between Australia and Asia, a phenomenon known as the Indonesian Throughflow. Rodgers et al. 1999 postulated that stronger trade winds associated with the ocean dynamical thermostat may increase the sea level difference between the Indian and Pacific oceans, increasing the throughflow and cooling the Pacific further. An et al. 2022 postulated a similar effect in the Indian Ocean could force changes to the Indian Ocean Dipole after carbon dioxide removal.

== Role in climate variability ==
The ocean dynamical thermostat has been used to explain:

- The observation that during Marine isotope stage 3, cooling in Greenland is associated with El Niño-like climate change in the Pacific.
- The decline in ENSO variability during periods with high solar variability.
- The transition to a cold Interdecadal Pacific Oscillation at the end of the 20th century.

=== Volcanic and solar influences ===
The ocean dynamical thermostat mechanism has been invoked to link volcanic eruptions to ENSO changes. Volcanic eruptions can cool the Earth by injecting aerosols and sulfur dioxide into the stratosphere, which reflect incoming solar radiation. It has been suggested that in paleoclimate records volcanic eruptions are often followed by El Niño events, but it is questionable whether this applies to known historical eruptions and results from climate modelling are equivocal. In some climate models an ocean dynamical thermostat process causes the onset of El Niño events after volcanic eruptions, in others additional atmospheric processes override the effect of the ocean dynamical thermostat on Pacific SST gradients.

The ocean dynamical thermostat process may explain variations in Pacific SSTs in the eastern Pacific that correlate to insolation changes such as the Dalton Minimum and to the solar cycle. During the early and middle Holocene when autumn and summer insolation was increased, but also during the Medieval Climate Anomaly between 900-1300 AD, SSTs off Baja California in the eastern Pacific were colder than usual. Southwestern North America underwent severe megadroughts during this time, which could also relate to a La Niña-like tendency in Pacific SSTs. Conversely, during periods of low insolation and during the Little Ice Age SSTs increased. This region lies within the California Current which is influenced by the eastern Pacific that controls the temperature of upwelled water. This was further corroborated by analyses with additional foraminifera species. Increased productivity in the ocean waters off Peru during the Medieval Climate Anomaly and the Roman Warm Period between 50-400 AD, when the worldwide climate was warmer, may occur through a thermostat-driven shallowing of the thermocline and increased upwelling of nutrient-rich waters. Additional mechanisms connecting the equatorial Pacific climate to insolation changes have been proposed, however.

=== Role in recent climate change ===
Changes in equatorial Pacific SSTs caused by anthropogenic global warming are an important problem in climate forecasts, as they influence local and global climate patterns. The ocean dynamical thermostat mechanism is expected to reduce the anthropogenic warming of the eastern Pacific relative to the western Pacific, thus strengthening the SST gradient and the Walker circulation. This is opposed by a weakening of the Walker circulation and the more effective evaporative cooling of the western Pacific under global warming. This compensation between different effects makes it difficult to estimate the eventual outcome of the Walker circulation and SST gradient. In CMIP5 models it is usually not the dominating effect.

The ocean dynamical thermostat has been invoked to explain contradictory changes in the Pacific Ocean in the 20th century. Specifically, there appears to be a simultaneous increase of the SST gradient, but also a weakening of the Walker circulation especially during boreal summer. All these observations are uncertain, owing to the particular choices of metrics used to describe SST gradients and Walker circulation strength, as well as measurement issues and biases. However, the ocean dynamical thermostat mechanism could explain why the SST gradient has increased during global warming and also why Walker circulation becomes stronger in autumn and winter, as these are the seasons when upwelling is strongest. On the other hand, warming in the Atlantic Ocean and more generally changes in between-ocean temperature gradients may play a role.

==== Projected future changes ====
Climate models usually depict an El Niño-like change, that is a decrease in the SST gradient. In numerous models, there is a time-dependent pattern with an initial increase in the SST gradient ("fast response") followed by a weakening of the gradient ("slow response") especially but not only in the case of abrupt increases of greenhouse gas concentrations. This may reflect a decreasing strength of the ocean dynamical thermostat with increasing warming and the warming of the upwelled water, which occurs with a delay of a few decades after the surface warming and is known as the "oceanic tunnel". On the other hand, climate models might underestimate the strength of the thermostat effect.

- According to An and Im 2014, in an oceanic dynamical model a doubling of carbon dioxide concentrations initially cools the eastern Pacific cold tongue, but a further increase in carbon dioxide concentrations eventually causes the cooling to stop and the cold tongue to shrink. Their model does not consider changes in the thermocline temperature, which would tend to occur after over a decade of global warming.
- According to Luo et al. 2017, the ocean dynamical thermostat eventually is overwhelmed first by a weakening of the trade winds and increased ocean stratification which decrease the supply of cold water to the upwelling zones, and second by the arrival of warmer subtropical waters there. In their model, the transition takes about a decade.
- According to Heede, Fedorov and Burls 2020, the greater climate warming outside of the tropics than inside of them eventually causes the water arriving to the upwelling regions to warm and the oceanic currents that transport it to weaken. This negates the thermostat effect after about two decades in the case of an abrupt increase of greenhouse gas concentrations, and after about half to one century when greenhouse gas concentrations are increasing more slowly.
- With further warming of the subsurface ocean, the strength of the ocean dynamical thermostat is expected to decline, because the decreasing stratification means that momentum is less concentrated in the surface layer and thus upwelling decreases.
- According to Heede and Fedorov 2021, in some climate models the thermostat mechanism initially prevails over other mechanisms and causes a cooling of the subtropical and central Pacific. Eventually most models converge to an equatorial warming pattern.
- Zhou et al. 2022 found that in carbon dioxide removal scenarios, the thermostat amplifies precipitation changes.
- Zheng et al. 2024 attributed changes of SST seasonality with global warming to the thermostat effect.

== Other contexts ==
The term "ocean dynamical thermostat" has also been used in slightly different contexts:

- The interaction between a weakening Walker circulation and the Equatorial Undercurrent (Note: The Equatorial Undercurrent is a strong ocean current under the surface of the equatorial Pacific, which is powered by westward surface winds. These transport water westwards, in turn inducing an eastward pressure force that powers the Equatorial Undercurrent while the wind-driven pressure acts to retard it. The Equatorial Undercurrent reaches the surface in the eastern Pacific and is the main source of upwelled water there.). Specifically, weaker easterly winds in the Pacific reduce the braking of the Undercurrent, thus accelerating it. This process dominates over the decrease in the eastward counterflow of the Undercurrent. Thus, a weaker Walker circulation can increase the flow of the Undercurrent and thus upwelling in the eastern Pacific, cooling it. Coupled general circulation models often do not depict this response of the Undercurrent and SST gradients correctly; the former may be the cause of the widespread underestimate of the SST gradients in these models.
- Stronger winds drive evaporative cooling of tropical SST.
- According to Heede, Fedorov and Burls 2020, in response to abrupt increases in greenhouse gas concentrations weak mean climatological winds allow the Indian Ocean to heat up more than the Pacific Ocean. This tends to induce stronger easterly winds over the Pacific which further dampen the warming in the Pacific Ocean. Unlike the ocean dynamical thermostat however this cooling effect is concentrated in the central-eastern Pacific, while westerly winds induced by warming over South America cause the eastern Pacific to warm.
