= El Niño–Southern Oscillation =

Global climate phenomenon

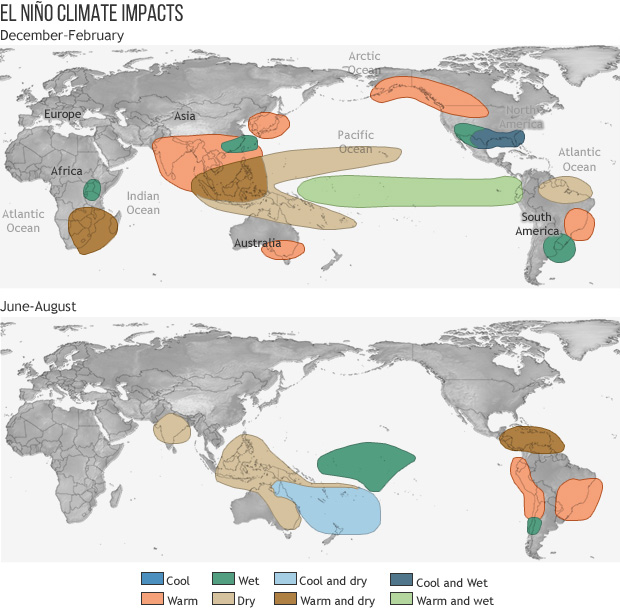
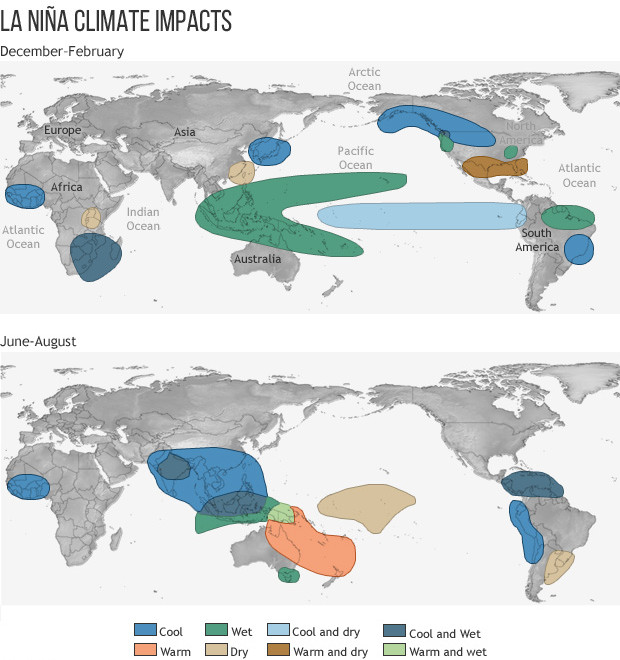
Changes to temperature and precipitation are different during El Niño and La Niña, and vary from season to season.

El Niño–Southern Oscillation (ENSO) is a global climate phenomenon that manifests as fluctuations in sea surface temperatures over the tropical Pacific Ocean. The warming phase of the sea surface temperature is known as "El Niño" and the cooling phase as "La Niña". It affects the climate of much of the tropics and subtropics, and has links (teleconnections) to higher-latitude regions of the world. The Southern Oscillation is the accompanying atmospheric oscillation, which is coupled with the sea temperature change. Numerous atmospheric characteristics respond to the oscillation including wind, surface air pressure and cloudiness.

The switching between El Niño, La Niña and neutral states has an irregular pattern but cycles approximately every two to seven years with varying intensity. The strength of the phenomenon tends to peak in the northern hemisphere winter, though regional impacts may peak at different times. The occurrence of ENSO is not easily predictable but it is monitored carefully by many weather organisations.

El Niño and La Niña affect the global climate and disrupt normal weather patterns, which can lead to intense storms in some places and droughts in others. El Niño events cause short-term (approximately one year in length) spikes in global average surface temperature, while La Niña events cause short term surface cooling. Therefore, the relative frequency of El Niño compared to La Niña events can affect global temperature trends on timescales of around ten years. The countries most affected by ENSO are developing countries that are bordering the Pacific Ocean and dependent on agriculture and fishing.

In climate change science, ENSO is known as one of the internal climate variability phenomena. Future trends in ENSO due to climate change are uncertain, although climate change exacerbates the effects of droughts and floods associated with ENSO. The IPCC Sixth Assessment Report summarized the scientific knowledge in 2021 for the future of ENSO as follows: "In the long term, it is very likely that the precipitation variance related to El Niño–Southern Oscillation will increase".

A key mechanism of ENSO is the Bjerknes feedback (named after Jacob Bjerknes in 1969) in which the atmospheric changes alter the sea temperatures that, in turn, alter the atmospheric winds in a positive feedback. Weaker easterly trade winds result in a surge of warm surface waters to the east and reduced ocean upwelling on the equator. In turn, this leads to warmer sea surface temperatures (called El Niño), a weaker Walker circulation (an east—west overturning circulation in the atmosphere) and even weaker trade winds. Ultimately, the warm waters in the western tropical Pacific are depleted enough so that conditions return to normal. The exact mechanisms that cause the oscillation are unclear and are being studied.

== Definition and terminology ==
The Southern Oscillation Index from 1876 to 2025. The Southern Oscillation is the atmospheric component of El Niño. This component is an oscillation in surface air pressure between the tropical eastern and the western Pacific Ocean waters.

The El Niño–Southern Oscillation is a single climate phenomenon that recurs in three phases: Neutral, La Niña or El Niño. La Niña and El Niño are opposite phases in the oscillation which are deemed to occur when specific ocean and atmospheric conditions are reached or exceeded.

The warming phase of the sea surface temperature is known as "El Niño", and its cooling phase as "La Niña". The "Southern Oscillation" is the oscillation in surface air pressure between the tropical eastern Pacific Ocean waters and the tropical western Pacific Ocean waters.

An early recorded mention of the term "El Niño" ("The Boy" in Spanish) in a climate context occurred in 1892, when Captain Camilo Carrillo reported to the geographical society congress in Lima that Peruvian sailors named the warm, south-flowing current after the Christ Child, as it typically appeared around Christmas.

Over time, the term has evolved and now refers to the warm and negative phase of the El Niño–Southern Oscillation (ENSO). The original phrase, El Niño de Navidad 'The Christmas Boy', arose centuries ago, when Peruvian fishermen named the weather phenomenon after the newborn Christ.

La Niña ("The Girl" in Spanish) is the colder counterpart of El Niño, as part of the broader ENSO climate pattern. In the past, it was also called an anti-El Niño and El Viejo 'the old man'.

A negative phase exists when atmospheric pressure over Indonesia and the West Pacific is abnormally high and pressure over the East Pacific is abnormally low during El Niño episodes, and a positive phase is when the opposite occurs during La Niña episodes.

== Fundamentals ==
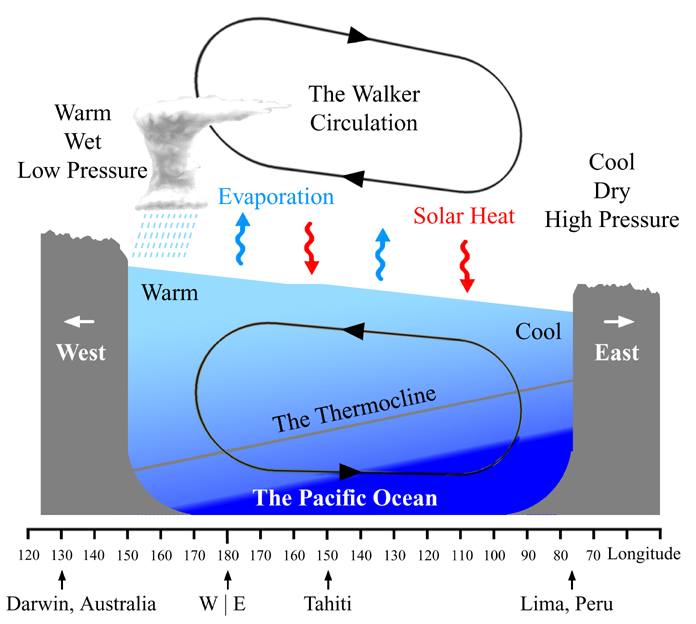
The West Pacific is typically warmer than the East Pacific. The warmer water in the West Pacific leads to: more clouds, more rainfall, and a lower air pressure. The buildup of warm waters towards the west also leads to a thicker layer of warm ocean water that lowers the depth of the thermocline.

On average, the temperature of the ocean surface in the tropical East Pacific is roughly 8–10 °C (14–18 °F) cooler than in the tropical West Pacific. The sea surface temperature (SST) of the West Pacific northeast of Australia averages around 28–30 °C (82–86 °F). SSTs in the East Pacific off the western coast of South America are closer to 20 °C (68 °F).

Strong trade winds near the equator drive water away from the East Pacific and into the West Pacific. This water is slowly warmed by the Sun as it moves west along the equator, the wind stress acting on the ocean surface being balanced by a sea surface slope. One result of this is that sea levels near Indonesia are typically around 0.5 m (1.5 ft) higher than that near Peru.

The warm surface waters collect in the western Pacific, with the result that the thermocline, the transitional zone between the warmer waters near the ocean surface and the cooler waters of the deep ocean, lies much deeper in the western Pacific, where it has an average depth of around 140 m (450 ft) compared to around 30 m (90 ft) in the East Pacific. At depth, the sloping surface thermocline helps reduce the east–west pressure difference due to the sea level slope, but below the thermocline, the pressure difference is still enough to drive the eastward flowing cold equatorial undercurrent.

The cooler deep ocean water replaces the outgoing surface waters in the East Pacific, rising to the ocean surface in a process called upwelling. Along the western coast of South America, water near the ocean surface is pushed westward due to the combination of the trade winds and the Coriolis effect. This process is known as Ekman transport. Colder water from deeper in the ocean rises along the continental margin to replace the near-surface water.

This process cools the East Pacific because the thermocline is closer to the ocean surface, leaving relatively little separation between the deeper cold water and the ocean surface. The northward-flowing Humboldt Current carries colder water from the Southern Ocean to the tropics in the East Pacific. The combination of the Humboldt Current and upwelling maintains an area of cooler ocean waters off the coast of Peru.

The West Pacific lacks a cold ocean current and has less upwelling as the trade winds are usually weaker than in the East Pacific, allowing the West Pacific to reach higher temperatures. These warmer waters provide energy for the upward movement of air. As a result, the warm West Pacific has, on average, more cloud and rain than the cool East Pacific.

ENSO describes a quasi-periodic change of both oceanic and atmospheric conditions over the tropical Pacific Ocean. These changes affect weather patterns across much of the Earth. The tropical Pacific is said to be in one of three states of ENSO (also called "phases") depending on the atmospheric and oceanic conditions. When the tropical Pacific roughly reflects the average conditions, the state of ENSO is said to be in the neutral phase. However, the tropical Pacific experiences occasional shifts away from these average conditions.

If the trade winds (blowing from east to west) are weaker than average, then both the upwelling in the East Pacific and the flow of warmer ocean surface waters towards the West Pacific lessen. This results in a cooler West Pacific and a warmer East Pacific, leading to a shift of cloud and rain towards the East Pacific. This situation is called El Niño. The opposite occurs if trade winds are stronger than average, leading to a warmer West Pacific and a cooler East Pacific. This situation is called La Niña and is associated with increased cloudiness and rainfall over the West Pacific.

=== Bjerknes feedback ===
The close relationship between ocean temperatures and the strength of the trade winds was first identified by Jacob Bjerknes in 1969. Bjerknes also hypothesized that ENSO was a positive feedback system where the associated changes in one component of the climate system (the ocean or atmosphere) tend to reinforce changes in the other. This process is known as Bjerknes feedback. For example, during the growth of El Niño, the reduced contrast in ocean temperatures across the Pacific results in weaker trade winds, further reinforcing the El Niño state.

Although these associated changes in the ocean and atmosphere often occur together, the state of the atmosphere may resemble a different ENSO phase than the state of the ocean or vice versa. Because their states are closely linked, the variations of ENSO may arise from changes in both the ocean and atmosphere and not necessarily from an initial change of exclusively one or the other. Conceptual models explaining how ENSO operates generally accept the Bjerknes feedback hypothesis. However, ENSO would perpetually remain in one phase if Bjerknes feedback were the only process occurring.

Several theories have been proposed to explain how ENSO can change from one state to the next despite the positive feedback. These explanations broadly fall under two categories. In one view, the Bjerknes feedback naturally triggers negative feedbacks that end and reverse the abnormal state of the tropical Pacific. This perspective implies that the processes that lead to El Niño and La Niña also eventually bring about their end, making ENSO a self-sustaining process. Other theories view the state of ENSO as being changed by irregular and external phenomena such as the Madden–Julian oscillation, tropical instability waves, and westerly wind bursts.

=== Walker circulation ===
Bjerknes proposed that ENSO was due to an east–west overturning atmospheric cell above the Pacific, which he named the Walker Circulation after Gilbert Walker who discovered the Southern Oscillation during the early twentieth century. Bjerknes proposed that the strength of the cell depended on the east–west temperature gradient along the Equator, the rising branch of the cell being associated with high sea temperatures, convection and rainfall in the western Pacific, while the downward branch occurs over cooler sea surface temperatures in the central and eastern Pacific.

During the growth of El Niños, the increased sea surface temperature in the east reduces the east–west temperature gradient and reduces the strength of the overturning. This, in turn, reduces the easterly winds at the ocean surface, reduces the upwelling of cold water and eventually results in even warmer sea surface temperatures in the eastern Pacific.

=== Southern Oscillation ===
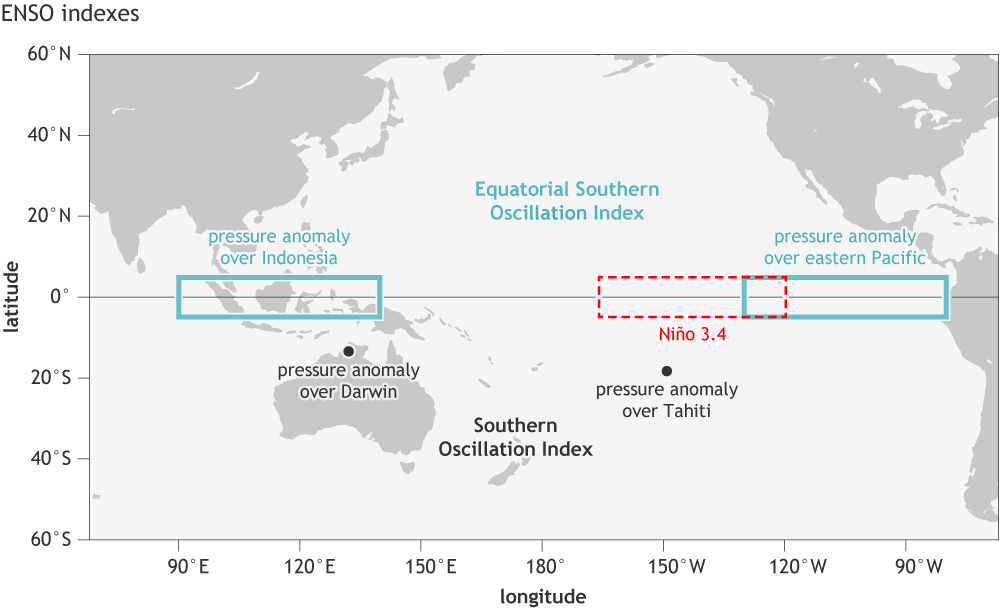
The regions where the air pressure are measured and compared to generate the Southern Oscillation Index

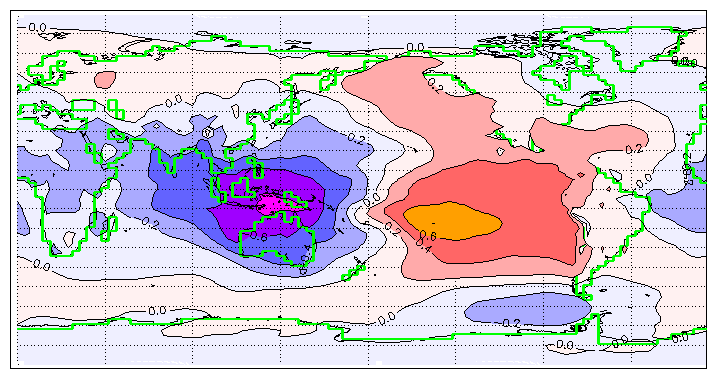
The Southern Oscillation Index correlated with mean sea level pressure.

The Southern Oscillation is the atmospheric component of ENSO. This component is an oscillation in surface air pressure between the tropical eastern and the western Pacific Ocean waters. The strength of the Southern Oscillation is measured by the Southern Oscillation Index (SOI). The SOI is computed from fluctuations in the surface air pressure difference between Tahiti (in the Pacific) and Darwin, Australia (on the Indian Ocean).

El Niño episodes have negative SOI, meaning there is lower pressure over Tahiti and higher pressure in Darwin. La Niña episodes on the other hand have positive SOI, meaning there is higher pressure in Tahiti and lower in Darwin.

Low atmospheric pressure tends to occur over warm water and high pressure occurs over cold water, in part because of deep convection over the warm water. El Niño episodes are defined as sustained warming of the central and eastern tropical Pacific Ocean, thus resulting in a decrease in the strength of the Pacific trade winds, and a reduction in rainfall over eastern and northern Australia. La Niña episodes are defined as sustained cooling of the central and eastern tropical Pacific Ocean, thus resulting in an increase in the strength of the Pacific trade winds, and the opposite effects in Australia when compared to El Niño.

Although the Southern Oscillation Index has a long station record going back to the 1800s, its reliability is limited due to the latitudes of both Darwin and Tahiti being well south of the Equator, so that the surface air pressure at both locations is less directly related to ENSO. To overcome this effect, a new index was created, named the Equatorial Southern Oscillation Index (EQSOI). To generate this index, two new regions, centered on the Equator, were defined. The western region is located over Indonesia and the eastern one over the equatorial Pacific, close to the South American coast. However, data on EQSOI goes back only to 1949.

Sea surface height (SSH) changes up or down by several centimeters in Pacific equatorial region with the ENSO: El Niño causes a positive SSH anomaly (raised sea level) because of thermal expansion while La Niña causes a negative SSH anomaly (lowered sea level) via contraction.

== Three phases of sea surface temperature ==
The El Niño–Southern Oscillation is a single climate phenomenon that quasi-periodically fluctuates between three phases: Neutral, La Niña or El Niño. La Niña and El Niño are opposite phases, which require certain changes to take place in both the ocean and the atmosphere before an event is declared.

The cool phase of ENSO is La Niña, with SST in the eastern Pacific below average, and air pressure high in the eastern Pacific and low in the western Pacific. The ENSO cycle, including both El Niño and La Niña, causes global changes in temperature and rainfall.

Neutral phase: Equatorial winds gather and pool warm water toward the west. Warm pool in the west drives deep atmospheric convection. In the east local winds cause nutrient-rich cold water to upwell at the Equator and along the South American coast.

El Niño phase: Warm water pool approaches the South American coast. The absence of cold upwelling increases warming. Warm water and atmospheric convection move eastwards. In strong El Niños the deeper thermocline off South America means upwelled water is warm and nutrient poor.

La Niña phase: Warm water is farther west than usual.

=== Neutral phase ===
If the temperature variation from climatology is within 0.5 °C (0.9 °F), ENSO conditions are described as neutral. Neutral conditions are the transition between warm and cold phases of ENSO. Sea surface temperatures (by definition), tropical precipitation, and wind patterns are near average conditions during this phase. Close to half of all years are within neutral periods. During the neutral ENSO phase, other climate anomalies/patterns such as the sign of the North Atlantic Oscillation or the Pacific–North American teleconnection pattern exert more influence.

=== El Niño phase ===
A loop of the 1997–98 El Niño event showing extreme sea surface temperature (SST) anomalies in the east tropical Pacific

El Niño conditions are established when the Walker circulation weakens or reverses and the Hadley circulation strengthens, leading to the development of a band of warm ocean water in the central and east-central equatorial Pacific (approximately between the International Date Line and 120°W), including the area off the west coast of South America, as upwelling of cold water occurs less or not at all offshore.

This warming causes a shift in the atmospheric circulation, leading to higher air pressure in the western Pacific and lower in the eastern Pacific, with rainfall reducing over Indonesia, India and northern Australia, while rainfall and tropical cyclone formation increases over the tropical Pacific Ocean. The low-level surface trade winds, which normally blow from east to west along the equator, either weaken or start blowing from the other direction.

El Niño phases are known to happen at irregular intervals of two to seven years, and lasts nine months to two years. The average period length is five years. When this warming occurs for seven to nine months, it is classified as El Niño "conditions"; when its duration is longer, it is classified as an El Niño "episode".

Timeline of El Niño episodes between 1900 and 2026

It is thought that there have been at least 30 El Niño events between 1900 and 2024, with the 1982–83, 1997–98 and 2014–16 events among the strongest on record. Since 2000, El Niño events have been observed in 2002–03, 2004–05, 2006–07, 2009–10, 2014–16, 2018–19, 2023–24, and 2026.

Major ENSO events were recorded in the years 1790–93, 1828, 1876–78, 1891, 1925–26, 1972–73, 1982–83, 1997–98, 2014–16, 2023–24 and 2026–27. During strong El Niño episodes, a secondary peak in sea surface temperature across the far eastern equatorial Pacific Ocean sometimes follows the initial peak.

=== La Niña phase ===
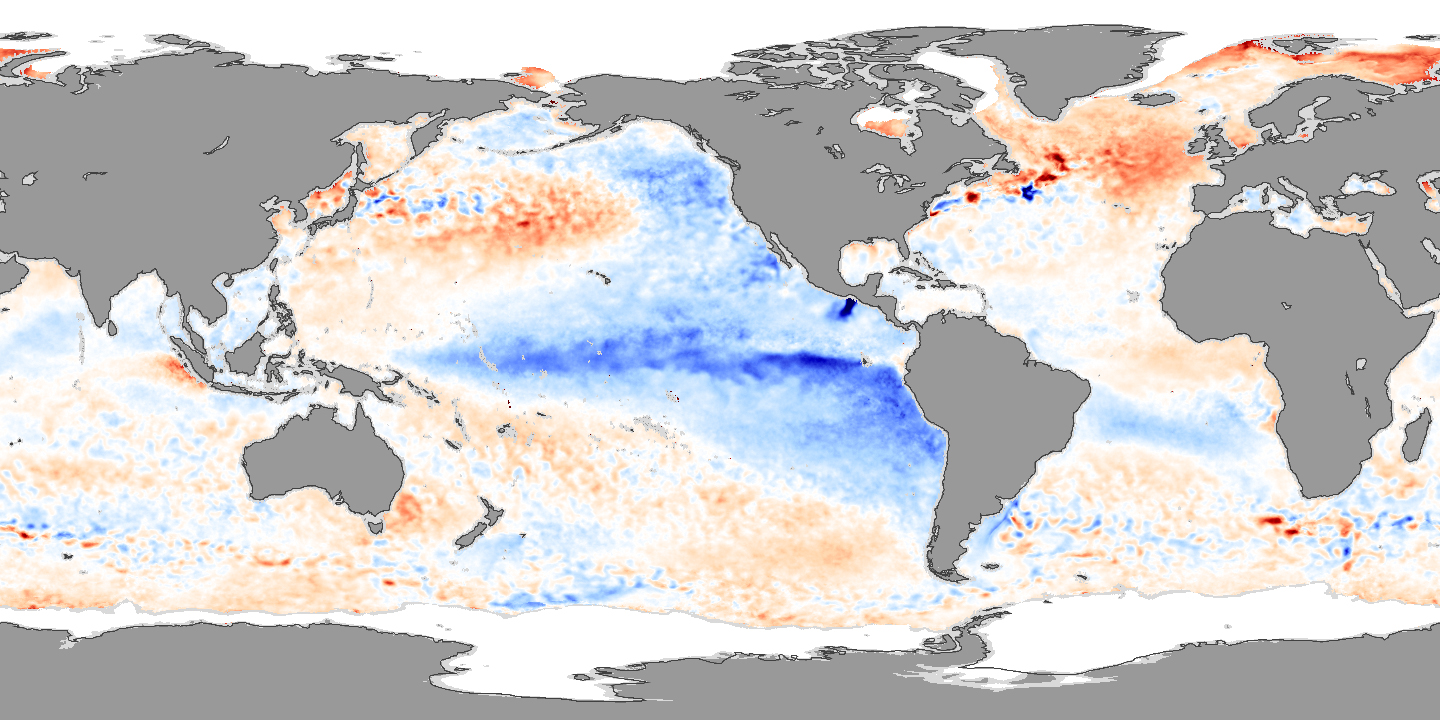
Sea surface temperature anomalies in November 2007, showing La Niña conditions

An especially strong Walker circulation causes La Niña, which is considered to be the cold oceanic and positive atmospheric phase of the broader El Niño–Southern Oscillation (ENSO) weather phenomenon, as well as the opposite of El Niño weather pattern, where sea surface temperature across the eastern equatorial part of the central Pacific Ocean will be lower than normal by 3–5 °C (5.4–9 °F). The phenomenon occurs as strong winds blow warm water at the ocean's surface away from South America, across the Pacific Ocean towards Indonesia. As this warm water moves west, cold water from the deep sea rises to the surface near South America.

The movement of so much heat across a quarter of the planet, and particularly in the form of temperature at the ocean surface, can have a significant effect on weather across the entire planet. Tropical instability waves visible on sea surface temperature maps, showing a tongue of colder water, are often present during neutral or La Niña conditions.

La Niña is a complex weather pattern that occurs every few years, often persisting for longer than five months. El Niño and La Niña can be indicators of weather changes across the globe. Atlantic and Pacific hurricanes can have different characteristics due to lower or higher wind shear and cooler or warmer sea surface temperatures.

A timeline of all La Niña episodes between 1900 and 2023. Note that each forecast agency has a different criteria for what constitutes a La Niña event, which is tailored to their specific interests.

La Niña events have been observed for hundreds of years, and occurred on a regular basis during the early parts of both the 17th and 19th centuries. Since the start of the 20th century, La Niña events have occurred during the following years: (Note: The following sources identified the listed "La Niña years": "La Niña years". The NOAA News. National Oceanic and Atmospheric Administration. Archived from the original on 20 December 2016.; La Niña and winter weather (Report). National Oceanic and Atmospheric Administration. Archived from the original on 14 March 2014.; ENSO Impacts on the U.S. – Previous Events. Climate Prediction Center. cpc.noaa.gov (Report). Monitoring & Data. U.S. National Oceanic and Atmospheric Administration. 4 November 2015. Archived from the original on 6 December 2010.; "La Niña Information". Public Affairs. U.S. National Oceanic and Atmospheric Administration. Archived from the original on 12 August 2014.; Sutherland, Scott (16 February 2017). "La Niña calls it quits. Is El Niño paying us a return visit?". The Weather Network. Archived from the original on 18 February 2017.; "El Niño/Southern Oscillation (ENSO) diagnostic discussion" (PDF). Climate Prediction Center / NCEP / NWS and the International Research Institute for Climate and Society. 10 September 2020. Archived (PDF) from the original on 17 September 2020.)

1. 1903–04
2. 1906–07
3. 1909–11
4. 1916–18
5. 1924–25
6. 1928–30
7. 1938–39
8. 1942–43
9. 1949–51
10. 1954–57
11. 1964–65
12. 1970–72
13. 1973–76
14. 1983–85
15. 1988–89
16. 1995–96
17. 1998–2001
18. 2005–06
19. 2007–08
20. 2008–09
21. 2010–12
22. 2016
23. 2017–18
24. 2020–23
25. 2024–25
26. 2025–26

=== Transitional phases ===
Transitional phases at the onset or departure of El Niño or La Niña can also be important factors on global weather by affecting teleconnections. Significant episodes, known as Trans-Niño, are measured by the Trans-Niño index (TNI). Examples of affected short-time climate in North America include precipitation in the Northwest US and intense tornado activity in the contiguous US.

== Variations ==
=== ENSO Modoki ===
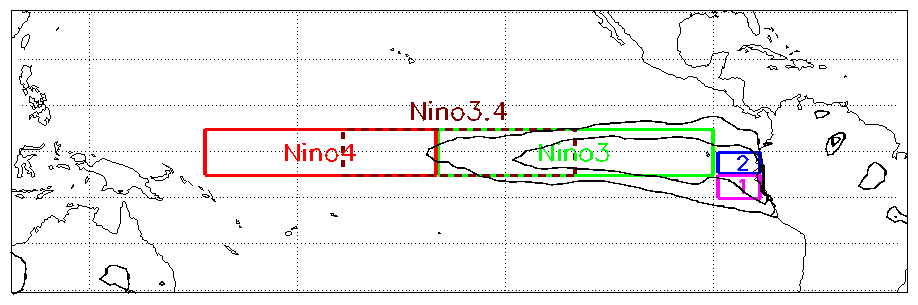
A map showing Niño/Niña 1 to 4 regions, 3 and 4 being west and far west and much larger than 1 and 2. A coastal Peruvian/Ecuadorian zone differs subtly from north–south.

The first ENSO pattern to be recognised, called Eastern Pacific (EP) ENSO, to distinguish it from others, involves temperature anomalies in the eastern Pacific. In the 1990s and 2000s, variations of ENSO conditions were observed, in which the usual place of the temperature anomaly (Niño 1 and 2) is not affected, but an anomaly also arises in the central Pacific (Niño 3.4). The phenomenon is called Central Pacific (CP) ENSO, "dateline" ENSO (because the anomaly arises near the dateline), or ENSO "Modoki" (Modoki is Japanese for "similar, but different"). There are variations of ENSO additional to the EP and CP types, and some scientists argue that ENSO exists as a continuum, often with hybrid types.

The effects of the CP ENSO are different from those of the EP ENSO. The El Niño Modoki is associated with more hurricanes more frequently making landfall in the Atlantic. La Niña Modoki leads to a rainfall increase over northwestern Australia and northern Murray–Darling basin, rather than over the eastern portion of the country as in a conventional EP La Niña. Also, La Niña Modoki increases the frequency of cyclonic storms over Bay of Bengal, but decreases the occurrence of severe storms in the Indian Ocean overall.

The first recorded El Niño that originated in the central Pacific and moved toward the east was in 1986. Recent Central Pacific El Niños happened in 1986–87, 1991–92, 1994–95, 2002–03, 2004–05 and 2009–10. There were "Modoki" events in 1957–59, 1963–64, 1965–66, 1968–70, 1977–78 and 1979–80. Some sources say that the El Niños of 2006-07 and 2014-16 were also Central Pacific El Niños. Recent years when La Niña Modoki events occurred include 1973–1974, 1975–1976, 1983–1984, 1988–1989, 1998–1999, 2000–2001, 2008–2009, 2010–2011, and 2016–2017.

The recent discovery of ENSO Modoki has some scientists believing it to be linked to global warming. However, comprehensive satellite data go back only to 1979. More research must be done to find the correlation and study past El Niño episodes. More generally, there is no scientific consensus on how/if climate change might affect ENSO.

There is also a scientific debate on the very existence of this "new" ENSO. A number of studies dispute the reality of this statistical distinction or its increasing occurrence, or both, either arguing the reliable record is too short to detect such a distinction, finding no distinction or trend using other statistical approaches, or that other types should be distinguished, such as standard and extreme ENSO.

Likewise, following the asymmetric nature of the warm and cold phases of ENSO, some studies could not identify similar variations for La Niña, both in observations and in the climate models, but some sources could identify variations on La Niña with cooler waters on central Pacific and average or warmer water temperatures on both eastern and western Pacific, also showing eastern Pacific Ocean currents going to the opposite direction compared to the currents in traditional La Niñas.

=== ENSO Costero ===
Coined by the Peruvian Comité Multisectorial Encargado del Estudio Nacional del Fenómeno El Niño (ENFEN), ENSO Costero, or ENSO Oriental, is the name given to the phenomenon where the sea-surface temperature anomalies are mostly focused on the South American coastline, especially from Peru and Ecuador. Studies point many factors that can lead to its occurrence, sometimes accompanying, or being accompanied, by a larger EP ENSO occurrence, or even displaying opposite conditions from the observed ones in the other Niño regions when accompanied by Modoki variations.

ENSO Costero events usually present more localized effects, with warm phases leading to increased rainfall over the coast of Ecuador, northern Peru and the Amazon rainforest, and increased temperatures over the northern Chilean coast, and cold phases leading to droughts on the Peruvian coast, and increased rainfall and decreased temperatures on its mountainous and jungle regions.

Because they don't influence the global climate as much as the other types, these events present lesser and weaker correlations to other significant ENSO features, neither always being triggered by Kelvin waves, nor always being accompanied by proportional Southern Oscillation responses. According to the Coastal Niño Index (ICEN), strong El Niño Costero events include 1957, 1982–83, 1997–98 and 2015–16, and La Niña Costera ones include 1950, 1954–56, 1962, 1964, 1966, 1967–68, 1970–71, 1975–76 and 2013.

== Monitoring and declaration of conditions ==
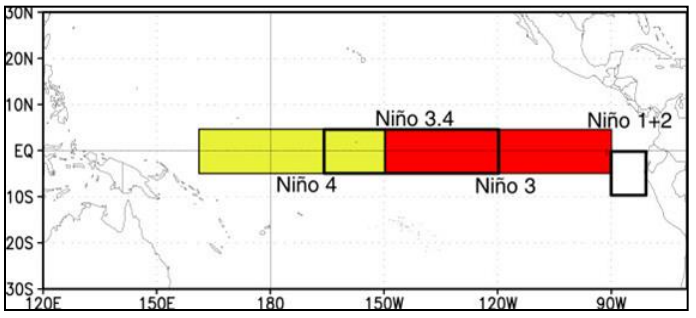
The "Niño regions" where sea surface temperatures are monitored to determine the current ENSO phase (warm or cold)

Currently, each country has a different threshold for what constitutes an El Niño event, which is tailored to their specific interests, for example:

- In the United States, an El Niño is declared when the Climate Prediction Center, which monitors the sea surface temperatures in the Niño 3.4 region and the tropical Pacific, forecasts that the sea surface temperature will be .5 °C (0.90 °F) above average or more for the next several seasons. The Niño 3.4 region stretches from the 120th to 170th meridians west longitude astride the equator five degrees of latitude on either side, are monitored. It is approximately 3,000 kilometres (1,900 mi) to the southeast of Hawaii. The most recent three-month average for the area is computed, and if the region is more than 0.5 °C (0.9 °F) above (or below) normal for that period, then an El Niño (or La Niña) is considered in progress. In February 2026, anomalous increases in tropical sea surface temperatures caused NOAA to revise the threshold distinguishing La Niña and El Niño from each other. The new method replaces a dependency on a 30-year climate base period with the Relative Oceanic Niño Index (RONI): a comparison of the ENSO region to the global tropics.
- The Australian Bureau of Meteorology looks at the trade winds, Southern Oscillation Index, weather models and sea surface temperatures in the Niño 3 and 3.4 regions, before declaring an ENSO event.
- The Japan Meteorological Agency declares that an ENSO event has started when the average five month sea surface temperature deviation for the Niño 3 region is over 0.5 °C (0.90 °F) for six consecutive months or longer.
- The Peruvian government declares that an ENSO Costero is under way if the sea surface temperature deviation in the Niño 1+2 regions equal or exceed 0.4 °C (0.72 °F) for at least three months.
- The United Kingdom's Met Office also uses a several month period to determine ENSO state. When this warming or cooling occurs for only seven to nine months, it is classified as El Niño/La Niña "conditions"; when it occurs for more than that period, it is classified as El Niño/La Niña "episodes".
- The India Meteorological Department (IMD) incorporates ENSO monitoring into its operational forecasting framework, as ENSO is one of the principal drivers of interannual variability in the Indian summer monsoon. According to the IMD, ENSO conditions are assessed alongside the Indian Ocean Dipole (IOD) using surface and upper-air observations, satellite and radar data, ocean observations and numerical weather prediction models.

== Effects on global climate ==
Heat storms—generally defined as heat waves of long duration and covering wide areas—have increased in recent decades, under one definition growing from five per year in the 1960s to 102 per year in the 2020s through September 2026. Spikes in heat storms have often followed within months after El Niño events.

In climate change science, ENSO is known as one of the internal climate variability phenomena. The other two main ones are Pacific decadal oscillation and Atlantic multidecadal oscillation.

La Niña impacts the global climate and disrupts normal weather patterns, which can lead to intense storms in some places and droughts in others. El Niño events cause short-term (approximately 1 year in length) spikes in global average surface temperature while La Niña events cause short term cooling. Therefore, the relative frequency of El Niño compared to La Niña events can affect global temperature trends on decadal timescales.

=== Climate change ===
Colored bars show how El Niño years (red, regional warming) and La Niña years (blue, regional cooling) relate to overall global warming. The El Niño–Southern Oscillation has been linked to variability in longer-term global average temperature increase, with El Niño years usually corresponding to annual global temperature increases.

2023's June–July–August season was the warmest on record globally by a large margin, as El Niño conditions continued to develop. 1998—a very strong El Niño year—also experienced a global temperature spike.

Global average surface temperatures, shown here for each January, reached a record temperature change of 1.75 °C over pre-industrial levels on one day in January 2025—despite the Earth being in a La Niña (regional cooling) phase.

The consequences of ENSO in terms of the temperature anomalies and precipitation and weather extremes around the world are clearly increasing and associated with climate change. For example, recent scholarship (since about 2019) has found that climate change is increasing the frequency of extreme El Niño events. Previously there was no consensus on whether climate change will have any influence on the strength or duration of El Niño events, as research alternately supported El Niño events becoming stronger and weaker, longer and shorter.

While much longer observation of ENSO is needed to robustly detect changes, a large ensemble experiment with multiple climate models shows an increase of approximately 10% in eastern Pacific ENSO amplitude between the 1901–1960 and 1961–2020 periods of greenhouse-gas increase. Compared to centuries-long runs with pre-industrial GHG concentrations, the ensemble of 1961–2020 results shows twice the likelihood of strong eastern Pacific El Niño events and nine times the likelihood of strong central Pacific La Niña events.

The IPCC Sixth Assessment Report summarized the state of the art of research in 2021 into the future of ENSO as follows:

- "In the long term, it is very likely that the precipitation variance related to El Niño–Southern Oscillation will increase" and
- "It is very likely that rainfall variability related to changes in the strength and spatial extent of ENSO teleconnections will lead to significant changes at regional scale". and
- "There is medium confidence that both ENSO amplitude and the frequency of high-magnitude events since 1950 are higher than over the period from 1850 and possibly as far back as 1400".

=== Investigations regarding tipping points ===
The ENSO is considered to be a potential tipping element in Earth's climate. Global warming can strengthen the ENSO teleconnection and resulting extreme weather events. For example, an increase in the frequency and magnitude of El Niño events have triggered warmer than usual temperatures over the Indian Ocean, by modulating the Walker circulation. This has resulted in a rapid warming of the Indian Ocean, and consequently a weakening of the Asian Monsoon.

Earlier (2008) list of tipping elements in the climate system. When compared to later lists, the major differences are that in 2008 ENSO, Indian summer monsoon, Arctic ozone hole and all of Arctic sea ice were all listed as tipping points. Labrador-Irminger circulation, mountain glaciers and East Antarctic ice however were not included. This 2008 list also includes Antarctic bottom water (part of the Southern Ocean overturning circulation), which was left out of the 2022 list, but included in some subsequent ones.

The possibility that the El Niño–Southern Oscillation (ENSO) is a tipping element had attracted attention in the past. Normally strong winds blow west across the South Pacific Ocean from South America to Australia. Every two to seven years, the winds weaken due to pressure changes and the air and water in the middle of the Pacific warms up, causing changes in wind movement patterns around the globe. This is known as El Niño and typically leads to droughts in India, Indonesia and Brazil, and increased flooding in Peru. In 2015/2016, this caused food shortages affecting over 60 million people.

== Effects on weather patterns ==
El Niño affects the global climate and disrupts normal weather patterns, which can lead to intense storms in some places and droughts in others.

In June 2026, the UN warned that El Niño could become one of the strongest in decades, bringing extreme weather such as droughts, floods, storms and raising the chances of wildfires.

=== Tropical cyclones ===
Most tropical cyclones form on the side of the subtropical ridge closer to the equator, then move poleward past the ridge axis before recurving into the main belt of the Westerlies. Areas west of Japan and Korea tend to experience many fewer September–November tropical cyclone impacts during El Niño and neutral years. During El Niño years, the break in the subtropical ridge tends to lie near 130°E, which would favor the Japanese archipelago.

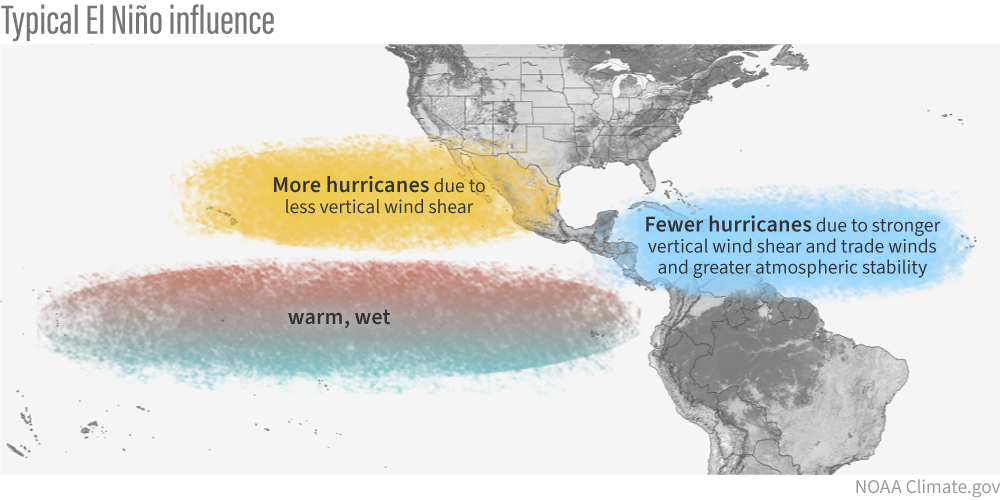
El Niño influence on hurricane season activity

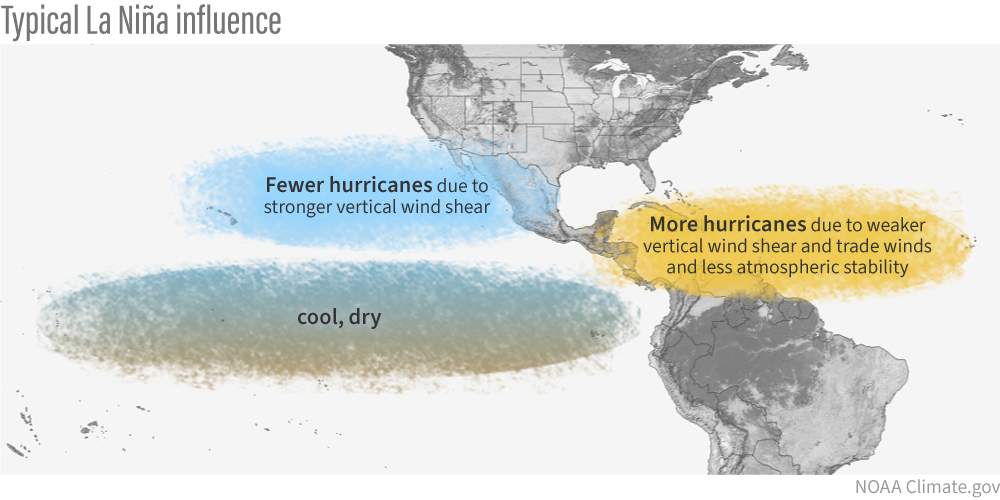
La Niña influence on hurricane season activity

Based on modeled and observed accumulated cyclone energy (ACE), El Niño years usually result in less active hurricane seasons in the Atlantic Ocean, but instead favor a shift to tropical cyclone activity in the Pacific Ocean, compared to La Niña years favoring above average hurricane development in the Atlantic and less so in the Pacific basin.

Over the Atlantic Ocean, vertical wind shear is increased, which inhibits tropical cyclone genesis and intensification, by causing the westerly winds to be stronger. The atmosphere over the Atlantic Ocean can also be drier and more stable during El Niño events, which can inhibit tropical cyclone genesis and intensification. Within the Eastern Pacific basin: El Niño events contribute to decreased easterly vertical wind shear and favor above-normal hurricane activity. However, the impacts of the ENSO state in this region can vary and are strongly influenced by background climate patterns.

The Western Pacific basin experiences a change in the location of where tropical cyclones form during El Niño events, with tropical cyclone formation shifting eastward, without a major change in how many develop each year. As a result of this change, Micronesia is more likely, and China less likely, to be affected by tropical cyclones. A change in the location of where tropical cyclones form also occurs within the Southern Pacific Ocean between 135°E and 120°W, with tropical cyclones more likely to occur within the Southern Pacific basin than the Australian region. As a result of this change tropical cyclones are 50% less likely to make landfall on Queensland, while the risk of a tropical cyclone is elevated for island nations like Niue, French Polynesia, Tonga, Tuvalu, and the Cook Islands.

=== Remote influence on tropical Atlantic Ocean ===
A study of climate records has shown that El Niño events in the equatorial Pacific are generally associated with a warm tropical North Atlantic in the following spring and summer. About half of El Niño events persist sufficiently into the spring months for the Western Hemisphere Warm Pool to become unusually large in summer. Occasionally, El Niño's effect on the Atlantic Walker circulation over South America strengthens the easterly trade winds in the western equatorial Atlantic region. As a result, an unusual cooling may occur in the eastern equatorial Atlantic in spring and summer following El Niño peaks in winter. Cases of El Niño-type events in both oceans simultaneously have been linked to severe famines related to the extended failure of monsoon rains.

== Impacts on humans and ecosystems ==
=== Economic impacts ===
El Niño has the most direct impact on life in the equatorial Pacific. Its effects propagate north and south along the coast of the Americas, affecting marine life around the Pacific. Changes in chlorophyll-a concentrations are visible in this animation, which compares phytoplankton in January and July 1998. Since then, scientists have improved both the collection and presentation of chlorophyll data.

When El Niño conditions last for many months, extensive ocean warming and the reduction in easterly trade winds limits upwelling of cold nutrient-rich deep water, and its economic effect on local fishing for an international market can be serious. Developing countries that depend on their own agriculture and fishing, particularly those bordering the Pacific Ocean, are usually most affected by El Niño conditions. In this phase of the Oscillation, the pool of warm water in the Pacific near South America is often at its warmest in late December.

The 2023 El Niño also disrupted weather patterns globally, with drought reducing maize production by up to 70% in some of Zimbabwe, Zambia and Malawi. The reduced harvests forced countries to declare states of disaster and appeal for international assistance to prevent widespread hunger. It also brought excessive rainfall to East Africa, causing flooding that destroyed crops and infrastructure in areas still recovering from consecutive years of drought.

A map showing the risk of El Niño to different areas of Zimbabwe

More generally, El Niño can affect commodity prices and the macroeconomy of different countries. It can constrain the supply of rain-driven agricultural commodities; reduce agricultural output, construction, and services activities; increase food prices; and may trigger social unrest in commodity-dependent poor countries that primarily rely on imported food.

A 2014 University of Cambridge Working Paper shows that while Australia, Chile, Indonesia, India, Japan, New Zealand and South Africa face a short-lived fall in economic activity in response to an El Niño shock, other countries may actually benefit from an El Niño weather shock (either directly or indirectly through positive spillovers from major trading partners), for instance, Argentina, Canada, Mexico and the United States. Most countries experience short-run inflationary pressures following an El Niño shock, while global energy and non-fuel commodity prices increase.

The IMF has traced El Niño events to macroeconomic performance. In a one-year time horizon, an El Niño shock is associated with changes in real GDP growth of -1.01% in Indonesia, -0.72% in South Africa, +0.5% in the United States, +1.57% in Mexico, and +1.81% in Thailand.

=== Health and social impacts ===
Extreme weather conditions related to the ENSO cycle correlate with changes in the incidence of epidemic diseases like Influenza pandemic, though studies have come to differing conclusions as to whether they are associated with the El Niño or the La Niña phase of the cycle.

El Niño cycles are associated with increased risks of some of the diseases transmitted by mosquitoes, such as malaria, dengue fever, and Rift Valley fever, with the latter having a severe outbreak after extreme rainfall in north-eastern Kenya and southern Somalia during the 1997–98 El Niño. Cycles of malaria in India, Venezuela, Brazil, and Colombia have now been linked to El Niño. Outbreaks of another mosquito-transmitted disease, Australian encephalitis (Murray Valley encephalitis—MVE), occur in temperate south-east Australia after heavy rainfall and flooding, which are associated with La Niña events.

ENSO conditions have also been related to Kawasaki disease incidence in Japan and the west coast of the United States, via the linkage to tropospheric winds across the north Pacific Ocean.

ENSO may be linked to civil conflicts. Scientists at The Earth Institute of Columbia University, having analyzed data from 1950 to 2004, suggest ENSO may have had a role in 21% of all civil conflicts since 1950, with the risk of annual civil conflict doubling from 3% to 6% in countries affected by ENSO during El Niño years relative to La Niña years.

=== Ecological consequences ===
During the 1982–83, 1997–98 and 2015–16 ENSO events, large extensions of tropical forests experienced a prolonged dry period that resulted in widespread fires, and drastic changes in forest structure and tree species composition in Amazonian and Bornean forests. Their impacts do not restrict only vegetation, since declines in insect populations were observed after extreme drought and terrible fires during El Niño 2015–16. Declines in habitat-specialist and disturbance-sensitive bird species and in large-frugivorous mammals were also observed in Amazonian burned forests, while temporary extirpation of more than 100 lowland butterfly species occurred at a burned forest site in Borneo.

In seasonally dry tropical forests, which are more drought tolerant, researchers found that El Niño induced drought increased seedling mortality. In a research published in October 2022, researchers studied seasonally dry tropical forests in a national park in Chiang Mai in Thailand for 7 years and observed that El Niño increased seedling mortality even in seasonally dry tropical forests and may impact entire forests in long run.

==== Coral bleaching ====
The Pacific Marine Environmental Laboratory attributes the first large-scale coral bleaching event in 1997–1998 to the warming waters of the concurrent El Niño event with possible contribution from anthropogenic climate change.

Most critically, global mass bleaching events were recorded in 1997–98 and 2015–16, when around 75–99% losses of live coral were registered across the world. Considerable attention was also given to the collapse of Peruvian and Chilean anchovy populations that led to a severe fishery crisis following the ENSO events in 1972–73, 1982–83, 1997–98 and, more recently, in 2015–16. In particular, increased surface seawater temperatures in 1982-83 also lead to the probable extinction of two hydrocoral species in Panamá, and to a massive mortality of kelp beds along 600 km of coastline in Chile, from which kelps and associated biodiversity slowly recovered in the most affected areas even after 20 years. All these findings enlarge the role of ENSO events as a strong climatic force driving ecological changes all around the world – particularly in tropical forests and coral reefs.

== Impacts by region ==
Observations of ENSO events since 1950 show that impacts associated with such events depend on the time of year. While some events and impacts are expected to occur, it is not certain that they will happen. The impacts that generally do occur during most El Niño events include below-average rainfall over Indonesia and northern South America, and above average rainfall in southeastern South America, eastern equatorial Africa, and the southern United States.

=== Africa ===
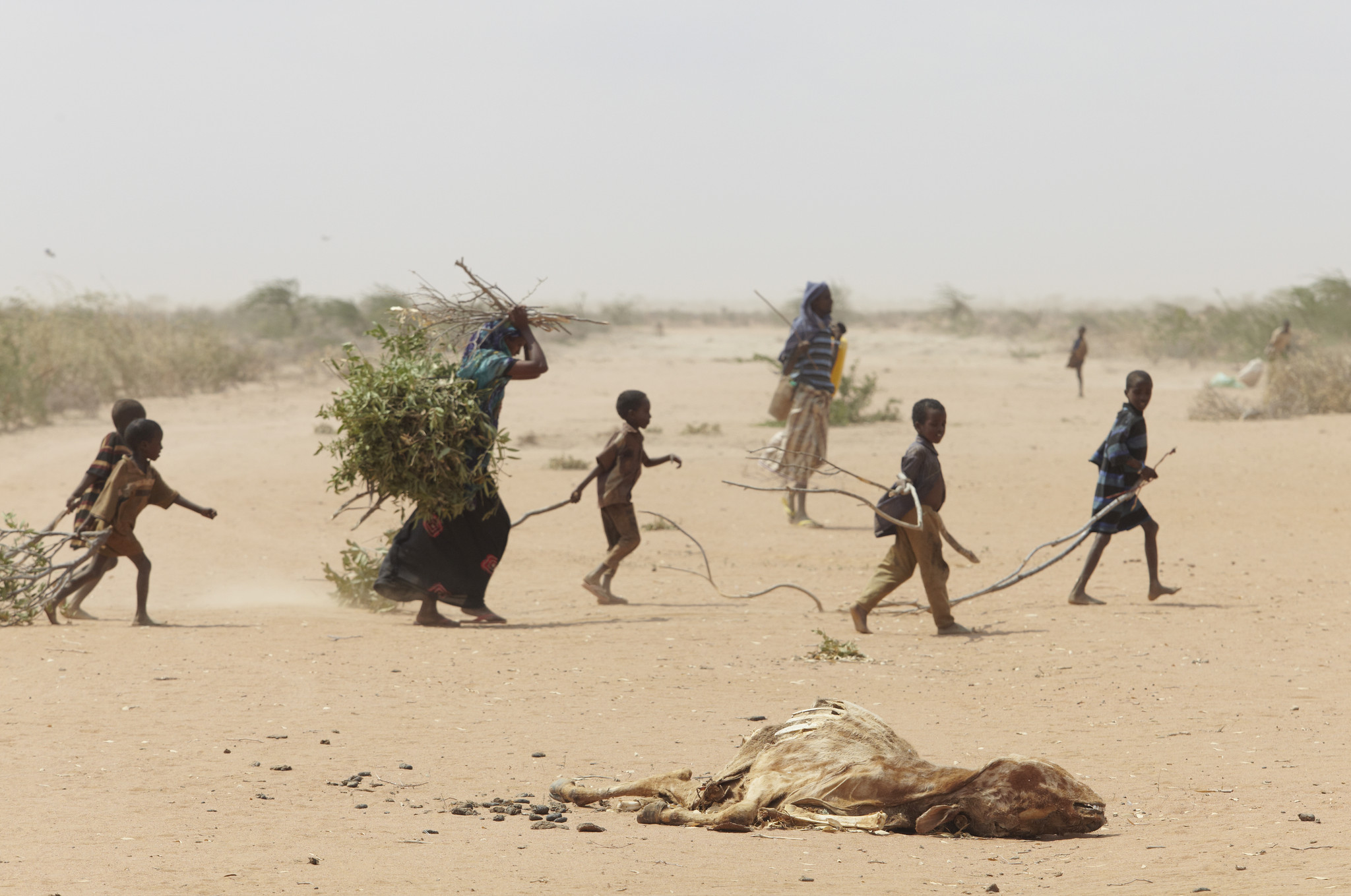
Between 50,000 and 100,000 people died during the 2011 East Africa drought.

La Niña results in wetter-than-normal conditions in southern Africa from December to February, and drier-than-normal conditions over equatorial east Africa over the same period.

The effects of El Niño on rainfall in southern Africa differ between the summer and winter rainfall areas. Winter rainfall areas tend to get higher rainfall than normal and summer rainfall areas tend to get less rain. The effect on the summer rainfall areas is stronger and has led to severe drought in strong El Niño events.

Sea surface temperatures off the west and south coasts of South Africa are affected by ENSO via changes in surface wind strength. During El Niño the south-easterly winds driving upwelling are weaker which results in warmer coastal waters than normal, while during La Niña the same winds are stronger and cause colder coastal waters. These effects on the winds are part of large scale influences on the tropical Atlantic and the South Atlantic High-pressure system, and changes to the pattern of westerly winds further south. There are other influences not known to be related to ENSO of similar importance. Some ENSO events do not lead to the expected changes.

=== Antarctica ===
Many ENSO linkages exist in the high southern latitudes around Antarctica. Specifically, El Niño conditions result in high-pressure anomalies over the Amundsen and Bellingshausen Seas, causing reduced sea ice and increased poleward heat fluxes in these sectors, as well as the Ross Sea. The Weddell Sea, conversely, tends to become colder with more sea ice during El Niño. The exact opposite heating and atmospheric pressure anomalies occur during La Niña. This pattern of variability is known as the Antarctic dipole mode, although the Antarctic response to ENSO forcing is not ubiquitous.

=== Asia ===
In Western Asia, during the region's November–April rainy season, there is increased precipitation in the El Niño phase and reduced precipitation in the La Niña phase on average.

During El Niño years: As warm water spreads from the west Pacific and the Indian Ocean to the east Pacific, it takes the rain with it, causing extensive drought in the western Pacific and rainfall in the normally dry eastern Pacific. Singapore experienced the driest February in 2010 since records began in 1869, with only 6.3 mm of rain falling in the month. The years 1968 and 2005 had the next driest Februaries, when 8.4 mm of rain fell.

During La Niña years, the formation of tropical cyclones, along with the subtropical ridge position, shifts westward across the western Pacific Ocean, which increases the landfall threat in China. In March 2008, La Niña caused a drop in sea surface temperatures over Southeast Asia by 2 °C (3.6 °F). It also caused heavy rains over the Philippines, Indonesia, and Malaysia.

=== Australia ===
Across most of the continent, El Niño and La Niña have more impact on climate variability than any other factor. There is a strong correlation between the strength of La Niña and rainfall: the greater the sea surface temperature and Southern Oscillation difference from normal, the larger the rainfall change.

During El Niño events, the shift in rainfall away from the Western Pacific may mean that rainfall across Australia is reduced. Over the southern part of the continent, warmer than average temperatures can be recorded as weather systems are more mobile and fewer blocking areas of high pressure occur. The onset of the Indo-Australian Monsoon in tropical Australia is delayed by two to six weeks, which as a consequence means that rainfall is reduced over the northern tropics. The risk of a significant bushfire season in south-eastern Australia is higher following an El Niño event, especially when it is combined with a positive Indian Ocean Dipole event.

Effects of the El Niño–Southern Oscillation in Australia are present across most of Australia, particularly the north and the east, and are one of the main climate drivers of the country. Associated with seasonal abnormality in many areas in the world, Australia is one of the continents most affected and experiences extensive droughts alongside considerable wet periods that cause major floods. There exist three phases — El Niño, La Niña, and Neutral, which help to account for the different states of ENSO.

Between 1900 and 2023, there have been 28 El Niño and 19 La Niña events in Australia including the 2023 El Niño event, which was declared in September in 2023. The events usually last for 9 to 12 months, but some can persist for two years, though the ENSO cycle generally operates over a time period from one to eight years.

In La Niña years, the eastern seaboard of Australia records above-average rainfall, usually creating damaging floods due to stronger easterly trade winds from the Pacific towards Australia, thus increasing moisture in Australia. El Niño is associated with a weakening, or even a setback, of the prevailing trade winds, and this, results in reduced atmospheric moisture in Australia. Many of the worst bushfires in Australia accompany ENSO events, and can be exacerbated by a positive Indian Ocean Dipole, where they tend to cause a warm, dry and windy climate.

=== Europe ===
El Niño's effects on Europe are controversial, complex and difficult to analyze, as it is only one of several factors that influence the weather on the continent; these other factors can overwhelm the signal.

=== North America ===
La Niña causes mostly the opposite effects of El Niño: above-average precipitation across the northern Midwest, the northern Rockies, Northern California, and the Pacific Northwest's southern and eastern regions. Meanwhile, precipitation in the southwestern and southeastern states, as well as southern California, is below average. This also allows for the development of many stronger-than-average hurricanes in the Atlantic and fewer in the Pacific.

ENSO is linked to rainfall over Puerto Rico. During an El Niño, snowfall is greater than average across the southern Rockies and Sierra Nevada mountain range, and is well-below normal across the Upper Midwest and Great Lakes states. During a La Niña, snowfall is above normal across the Pacific Northwest and western Great Lakes.

In Canada, La Niña will, in general, cause a cooler, snowier winter, such as the near-record-breaking amounts of snow recorded in the La Niña winter of 2007–2008 in eastern Canada.

In the spring of 2022, La Niña caused above-average precipitation and below-average temperatures in the state of Oregon. April was one of the wettest months on record, and La Niña effects, while less severe, were expected to continue into the summer.

Over North America, the main temperature and precipitation impacts of El Niño generally occur in the six months between October and March. In particular, the majority of Canada generally has milder than normal winters and springs, with the exception of eastern Canada where no significant impacts occur. Within the United States, the impacts generally observed during the six-month period include wetter-than-average conditions along the Gulf Coast between Texas and Florida, while drier conditions are observed in Hawaii, the Ohio Valley, Pacific Northwest and the Rocky Mountains.

Study of more recent weather events over California and the southwestern United States indicate that there is a variable relationship between El Niño and above-average precipitation, as it strongly depends on the strength of the El Niño event and other factors. Though it has been historically associated with high rainfall in California, the effects of El Niño depend more strongly on the "flavor" of El Niño than its presence or absence, as only "persistent El Niño" events lead to consistently high rainfall.

To the north across Alaska, La Niña events lead to drier than normal conditions, while El Niño events do not have a correlation towards dry or wet conditions. During El Niño events, increased precipitation is expected in California due to a more southerly, zonal, storm track. During La Niña, increased precipitation is diverted into the Pacific Northwest due to a more northerly storm track. During La Niña events, the storm track shifts far enough northward to bring wetter than normal winter conditions (in the form of increased snowfall) to the Midwestern states, as well as hot and dry summers. During the El Niño portion of ENSO, increased precipitation falls along the Gulf coast and Southeast due to a stronger than normal, and more southerly, polar jet stream.

==== Isthmus of Tehuantepec ====
The synoptic condition for the Tehuantepecer, a violent mountain-gap wind in between the mountains of Mexico and Guatemala, is associated with high-pressure system forming in Sierra Madre of Mexico in the wake of an advancing cold front, which causes winds to accelerate through the Isthmus of Tehuantepec. Tehuantepecers primarily occur during the cold season months for the region in the wake of cold fronts, between October and February, with a summer maximum in July caused by the westward extension of the Azores-Bermuda high pressure system.

Wind magnitude is greater during El Niño years than during La Niña years, due to the more frequent cold frontal incursions during El Niño winters. Tehuantepec winds reach 20 knots (40 km/h) to 45 knots (80 km/h), and on rare occasions 100 knots (190 km/h). The wind's direction is from the north to north-northeast. It leads to a localized acceleration of the trade winds in the region, and can enhance thunderstorm activity when it interacts with the Intertropical Convergence Zone. The effects can last from a few hours to six days. Between 1942 and 1957, La Niña had an impact that caused isotope changes in the plants of Baja California, and that had helped scientists to study his impact.

=== Pacific islands ===
During an El Niño event, New Zealand tends to experience stronger or more frequent westerly winds during their summer, which leads to an elevated risk of drier than normal conditions along the east coast. There is more rain than usual though on New Zealand's West Coast, because of the barrier effect of the North Island mountain ranges and the Southern Alps.

Fiji generally experiences drier than normal conditions during an El Niño, which can lead to drought becoming established over the Islands. However, the main impacts on the island nation is felt about a year after the event becomes established. Within the Samoan Islands, below average rainfall and higher than normal temperatures are recorded during El Niño events, which can lead to droughts and forest fires on the islands. Other impacts include a decrease in the sea level, possibility of coral bleaching in the marine environment and an increased risk of a tropical cyclone affecting Samoa.

In the late winter and spring during El Niño events, drier than average conditions can be expected in Hawaii. On Guam during El Niño years, dry season precipitation averages below normal, but the probability of a tropical cyclone is more than triple what is normal, so extreme short duration rainfall events are possible. On American Samoa during El Niño events, precipitation averages about 10 percent above normal, while La Niña events are associated with precipitation averaging about 10 percent below normal.

=== South America ===
The effects of El Niño in South America are direct and strong. An El Niño is associated with warm and very wet weather months in April–October along the coasts of northern Peru and Ecuador, causing major flooding whenever the event is strong or extreme.

Because El Niño's warm pool feeds thunderstorms above, it creates increased rainfall across the east-central and eastern Pacific Ocean, including several portions of the South American west coast. The effects of El Niño in South America are direct and stronger than in North America. An El Niño is associated with warm and very wet weather months in April–October along the coasts of northern Peru and Ecuador, causing major flooding whenever the event is strong or extreme. The effects during the months of February, March, and April may become critical along the west coast of South America, El Niño reduces the upwelling of cold, nutrient-rich water that sustains large fish populations, which in turn sustain abundant sea birds, whose droppings support the fertilizer industry. The reduction in upwelling leads to fish kills off the shore of Peru.

The local fishing industry along the affected coastline can suffer during long-lasting El Niño events. Peruvian fisheries collapsed during the 1970s due to overfishing following the 1972 El Niño Peruvian anchoveta reduction. The fisheries were previously the world's largest, however, this collapse led to the decline of these fisheries. During the 1982–83 event, jack mackerel and anchoveta populations were reduced, scallops increased in warmer water, but hake followed cooler water down the continental slope, while shrimp and sardines moved southward, so some catches decreased while others increased.

Horse mackerel have increased in the region during warm events. Shifting locations and types of fish due to changing conditions create challenges for the fishing industry. Peruvian sardines have moved during El Niño events to Chilean areas. Other conditions provide further complications, such as the government of Chile in 1991 creating restrictions on the fishing areas for self-employed fishermen and industrial fleets.

Southern Brazil and northern Argentina also experience wetter than normal conditions during El Niño years, but mainly during the spring and early summer. Central Chile receives a mild winter with large rainfall, and the Peruvian-Bolivian Altiplano receives more precipitation during its rainy season, sometimes being exposed to unusual winter snowfall events. Drier and hotter weather occurs in parts of the Amazon River Basin, Colombia, and Central America.

During a time of La Niña, drought affects the coastal regions of Peru and Chile. From December to February, northern Brazil is wetter than normal. La Niña causes higher than normal rainfall in the central Andes, which in turn causes catastrophic flooding on the Llanos de Mojos of Beni Department, Bolivia. Such flooding is documented from 1853, 1865, 1872, 1873, 1886, 1895, 1896, 1907, 1921, 1928, 1929 and 1931.

==== Galápagos Islands ====
The Galápagos Islands are a chain of volcanic islands, nearly 600 miles west of Ecuador, South America. in the Eastern Pacific Ocean. These islands support a wide diversity of terrestrial and marine species. The ecosystem is based on the normal trade winds which influence upwelling of cold, nutrient rich waters to the islands. During an El Niño event the trade winds weaken and sometimes blow from west to east, which causes the Equatorial current to weaken, raising surface water temperatures and decreasing nutrients in waters surrounding the Galápagos.

El Niño causes a trophic cascade which impacts entire ecosystems starting with primary producers and ending with critical animals such as sharks, penguins, and seals. The effects of El Niño can become detrimental to populations that often starve and die back during these years. Rapid evolutionary adaptations are displayed amongst animal groups during El Niño years to mitigate El Niño conditions.

== History ==
=== In geologic timescales ===
Evidence is also strong for El Niño events during the early Holocene epoch 10,000 years ago. Different modes of ENSO-like events have been registered in paleoclimatic archives, showing different triggering methods, feedbacks and environmental responses to the geological, atmospheric and oceanographic characteristics of the time. These paleorecords can be used to provide a qualitative basis for conservation practices.

Scientists have also found chemical signatures of warmer sea surface temperatures and increased rainfall caused by El Niño in coral specimens that are around 13,000 years old.

In a paleoclimate study published in 2024, the authors suggest that El Niños had a strong influence on Earth's hothouse climate during the Permian-Triassic extinction event. The increasing intensity and duration of El Niño events were associated with active volcanism, which resulted in the dieback of vegetation, an increase in the amount of carbon dioxide in the atmosphere, a significant warming and disturbances in the circulation of air masses.

Series/ epoch	Age of archive / Location / Type of archive or proxy	Description and references
Mid Holocene	4150 ya / Vanuatu Islands / Coral core	Coral bleaching in Vanuatu coral records, indication of shoaling of thermocline, is analyzed for Sr/Ca and U/Ca content, from which temperature is regressed. The temperature variability shows that during the mid-Holocene, changes in the position of the anticyclonic gyre produced average to cold (La Niña) conditions, which were probably interrupted by strong warm events (El Niño), which might have produced the bleaching, associated to decadal variability.
Holocene	12000ya / Bay of Guayaquil, Ecuador / Pollen content of marine core	Pollen records show changes in precipitation, possibly related to variability of the position of the ITCZ, as well as the latitudinal maxima of the Humboldt Current, which both depend on ENSO frequency and amplitude variability. Three different regimes of ENSO influence are found in the marine core.
Holocene	12000ya / Pallcacocha Lake, Ecuador / Sediment core	Core shows warm events with periodicities of 2–8 years, which become more frequent over the Holocene until about 1,200 years ago, and then decline, on top of which there are periods of low and high ENSO-related events, possibly due to changes in insolation.
LGM	45000ya / Australia / Peat core	Moisture variability in the Australian core shows dry periods related to frequent warm events (El Niño), correlated to DO events. Although no strong correlation was found with the Atlantic Ocean, it is suggested that the insolation influence probably affected both oceans, although the Pacific Ocean seems to have the most influence on teleconnection in annual, millennial and semi-precessional timescales.
Pleistocene	240 Kya / Indian and Pacific oceans / Coccolithophore in 9 deep sea cores	9 deep cores in the equatorial Indian and Pacific show variations in primary productivity, related to glacial-interglacial variability and precessional periods (23 ky) related to changes in the thermocline. There is also indication that the equatorial areas can be early responders to insolation forcing.
Pliocene	2.8 Mya / Spain / Lacustrine laminated sediments core	The basin core shows light and dark layers, related to summer/autumn transition where more/less productivity is expected. The core shows thicker or thinner layers, with periodicities of 12, 6–7 and 2–3 years, related to ENSO, North Atlantic Oscillation (NAO) and Quasi-biennial Oscillation (QBO), and possibly also insolation variability (sunspots).
Pliocene	5.3 Mya / Equatorial Pacific / Foraminifera in deep sea cores	Deep sea cores at ODP site 847 and 806 show that the Pliocene warm period presented permanent El Niño-like conditions, possibly related to changes in the mean state of extratropical regions or changes in ocean heat transport resulting from increased tropical cyclone activity.
Miocene	5.92-5.32 Mya / Italy / Evaporite varve thickness	The varve close to the Mediterranean shows 2–7 year variability, closely related to ENSO periodicity. Model simulations show that there is more correlation with ENSO than NAO, and that there is a strong teleconnection with the Mediterranean due to lower gradients of temperature.

=== During human history ===
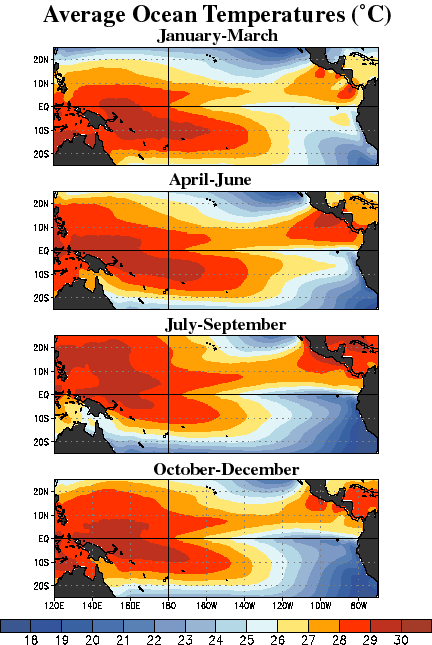
Average equatorial Pacific temperatures, published in 2009

ENSO conditions have occurred at two- to seven-year intervals for at least the past 300 years, but most of them have been weak.

El Niño may have led to the demise of the Moche (c. 700 AD) and of other pre-Columbian Peruvian cultures. Around 1525, when Francisco Pizarro first started exploring the eastern Pacific coast, he noted rainfall in the deserts, the first written record of the impacts of El Niño. A recent study suggests a strong El Niño effect between 1789 and 1793 caused poor crop-yields in Europe, which in turn helped touch off the French Revolution. The extreme weather produced by El Niño in 1876–77 gave rise to the most deadly famines of the 19th century. The 1876 famine alone in northern China killed up to 13 million people.

The phenomenon had long been of interest because of its effects on the guano industry and other enterprises that depend on biological productivity of the sea. It is recorded that as early as 1822, cartographer Joseph Lartigue, of the French frigate La Clorinde under Baron Mackau, noted the "counter-current" and its usefulness for traveling southward along the Peruvian coast.

The strongest El Niño on record (as of 2026) occurred from 1877 to 1878, and led to a global famine that killed more than 50 million people—about 3 to 4 percent of the estimated global population. In 1888, Charles Todd suggested that droughts in India and Australia tended to occur at the same time; Norman Lockyer noted the same in 1904. An El Niño connection with flooding was reported in 1894 by Victor Eguiguren (1852–1919) and in 1895 by Federico Alfonso Pezet (1859–1929). In 1924, Gilbert Walker (for whom the Walker circulation is named) coined the term "Southern Oscillation". He and others (including Norwegian-American meteorologist Jacob Bjerknes) are generally credited with identifying the El Niño effect.

The major 1982–83 El Niño led to an upsurge of interest from the scientific community. The period from 1991–1994 was unusual in that El Niños have rarely occurred in such rapid succession. An especially intense El Niño event in 1998 caused an estimated 16% of the world's reef systems to die. The event temporarily warmed air-temperature by 1.5 °C, compared to the usual increase of 0.25 °C associated with El Niño events. Since then, mass coral bleaching has become common worldwide, with all regions having suffered "severe bleaching".

In June 2026, the NOAA's Climate Prediction Center officially confirmed a return of El Niño, forecasting a strengthening of the phenomenon through the Northern-hemisphere winter of 2026–2027. The agency estimated a 69% likelihood that the event would reach a historically significant intensity, ranking among the strongest El Niño episodes recorded since 1950. In October of 2026, sea surface temperatures reached and surpassed 30°C for the first time in recorded history in the Niño 3.4 region, the main region used to observe El Niño events.Followed by this, daily sea surface temperature anomalies in the Niño 3.4 region reached 3.3°C-3.4°C, the strongest officially recorded in human history, surpassing the deadly 1877-1878 El Niño and the 2014-2016 El Niño.

== Related patterns ==
=== Madden–Julian oscillation ===
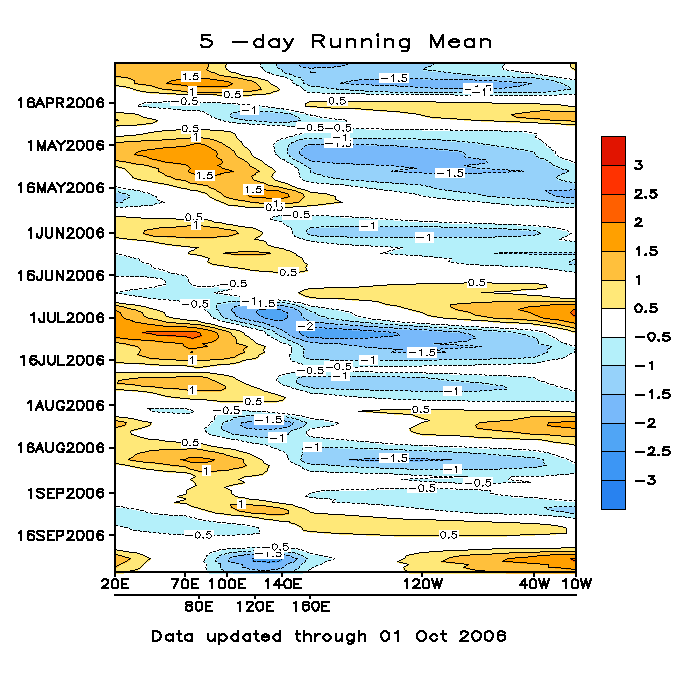
A Hovmöller diagram of the 5-day running mean of outgoing longwave radiation showing the MJO. Time increases from top to bottom in the figure, so contours that are oriented from upper-left to lower-right represent movement from west to east.

The Madden–Julian oscillation (MJO) is the largest element of the intraseasonal (30- to 90-day) variability in the tropical atmosphere. It was discovered in 1971 by Roland Madden and Paul Julian of the American National Center for Atmospheric Research (NCAR). It is a large-scale coupling between atmospheric circulation and tropical deep atmospheric convection. Unlike a standing pattern like the El Niño–Southern Oscillation (ENSO), the Madden–Julian oscillation is a traveling pattern that propagates eastward, at approximately 4 to 8 m/s (14 to 29 km/h; 9 to 18 mph), through the atmosphere above the warm parts of the Indian and Pacific oceans. This overall circulation pattern manifests itself most clearly as anomalous rainfall.

==== Link to the El Niño–Southern oscillation ====
There is strong year-to-year (interannual) variability in Madden–Julian oscillation activity, with long periods of strong activity followed by periods in which the oscillation is weak or absent. This interannual variability of the MJO is partly linked to the El Niño–Southern Oscillation (ENSO) cycle. In the Pacific, strong MJO activity is often observed 6 to 12 months prior to the onset of an El Niño episode, but is virtually absent during the maxima of some El Niño episodes, while MJO activity is typically greater during a La Niña episode. Strong events in the Madden–Julian oscillation over a series of months in the western Pacific can speed the development of an El Niño or La Niña but usually do not in themselves lead to the onset of a warm or cold ENSO event. However, observations suggest that the 1982-1983 El Niño developed rapidly during July 1982 in direct response to a Kelvin wave triggered by an MJO event during late May.

=== Pacific decadal oscillation ===
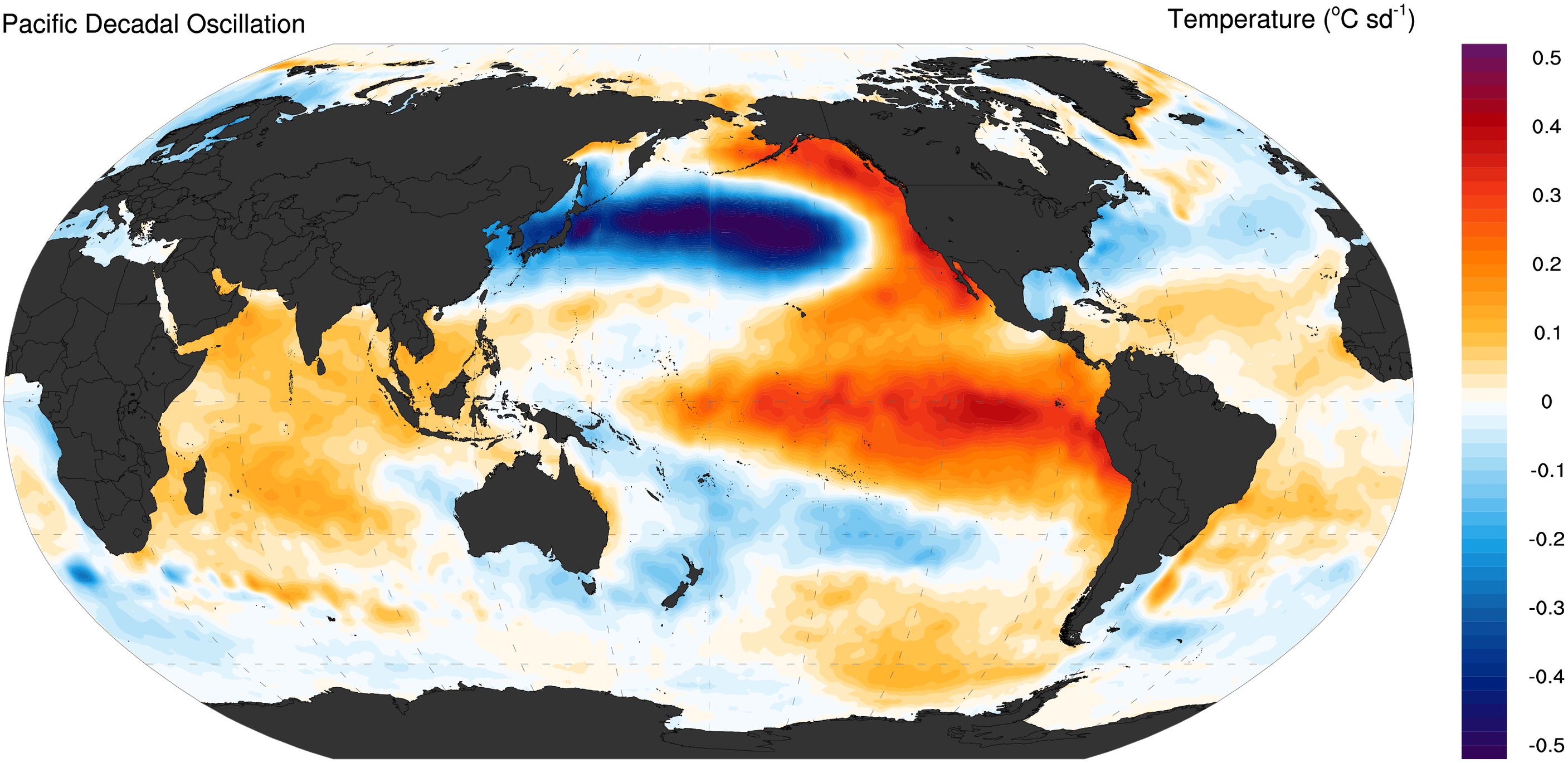
PDO positive phase global pattern

The Pacific decadal oscillation (PDO) is a robust, recurring pattern of ocean-atmosphere climate variability centered over the mid-latitude Pacific basin. The PDO is detected as warm or cool surface waters in the Pacific Ocean, north of 20°N. During the past century, the amplitude of this climate pattern has varied irregularly at interannual-to-interdecadal time scales, meaning, time periods of a few years to as much as time periods of multiple decades.

==== Mechanisms ====
ENSO can influence the global circulation pattern thousands of kilometers away from the equatorial Pacific through the "atmospheric bridge". During El Niño events, deep convection and heat transfer to the troposphere is enhanced over the anomalously warm sea surface temperature, this ENSO-related tropical forcing generates Rossby waves that propagate poleward and eastward and, are subsequently refracted back from the pole to the tropics. The planetary waves form at preferred locations both in the North and South Pacific Ocean, and the teleconnection pattern is established within 2–6 weeks. ENSO driven patterns modify surface temperature, humidity, wind, and the distribution of clouds over the North Pacific that alter surface heat, momentum, and freshwater fluxes and thus induce sea surface temperature, salinity, and mixed layer depth (MLD) anomalies.

=== Pacific Meridional Mode ===
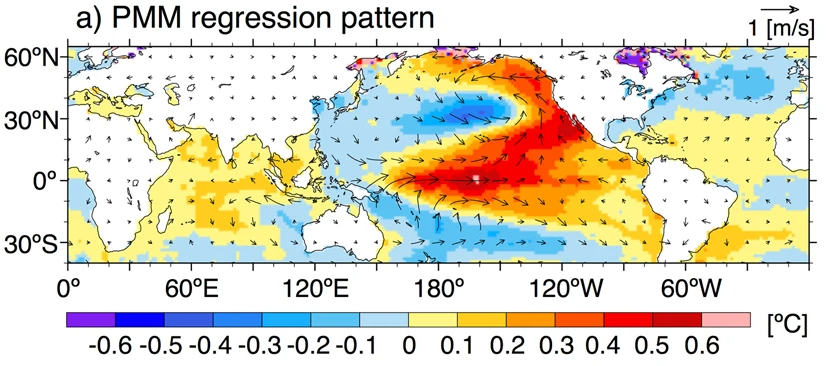
The SST and wind anomalies of the PMM positive phase

Pacific Meridional Mode (PMM) is a climate mode in the North Pacific. In its positive state, it is characterized by the coupling of weaker trade winds in the northeast Pacific Ocean between Hawaii and Baja California with decreased evaporation over the ocean, thus increasing sea surface temperatures (SST); and the reverse during its negative state. This coupling develops during the winter months and spreads southwestward towards the equator and the central and western Pacific during spring, until it reaches the Intertropical Convergence Zone (ITCZ), which tends to shift north in response to a positive PMM.

The PMM is not the same thing as the El Niño-Southern Oscillation (ENSO), but there is evidence that PMM events can trigger ENSO events, especially Central Pacific El Niño events. The PMM state can also modulate hurricane activity in the East Pacific and typhoon activity in the West Pacific oceans and alter precipitation on the continents surrounding the Pacific Ocean. The South Pacific Ocean has a PMM-like mode known as the "South Pacific Meridional Mode" (SPMM) that also influences the ENSO cycle.

In the early 21st century, the intensity of the 2014–16 El Niño event and the highly active 2018 Pacific hurricane and typhoon seasons have been attributed to positive PMM events. With anthropogenic global warming, PMM activity is likely to increase, and some scientists have proposed that a loss of Antarctic and especially Arctic sea ice will induce future positive PMM events.

== See also ==
- Ocean dynamical thermostat – Physical mechanism affecting sea surface temperatures in the Pacific Ocean
- Recharge oscillator – Theory of sea surface temperature
- Super El Niño – Global climate phenomenon

=== For La Niña ===
- 2000 Mozambique flood
- 2010 Pakistan floods
- 2010–2011 Queensland floods
- 2010–2012 La Niña event
- 2010–2011 Southern Africa floods
- 2010–2013 Southern United States and Mexico drought
- 2011 East Africa drought
- 2020 Atlantic hurricane season
- 2021 eastern Australia floods
- 2022 Suriname floods
- 2023 Auckland Anniversary Weekend floods
- 2020–2023 La Niña event

=== For El Niño ===
- 1789-1790 influenza epidemic
- 1982–83 El Niño event
- 1997 Pacific hurricane season
- 1997–98 El Niño event
- 2014–2016 El Niño event
- 2015 Pacific hurricane season
- 2023–2024 El Niño event
- 2026–2027 El Niño event

== Sources ==
This article incorporates text from a free content work. Licensed under CC BY 4.0 (license statement/permission). Text taken from The Impact of Disasters on Agriculture and Food Security 2025, The Food and Agriculture Organization of the United Nations.
