= Tropical instability waves =

Ocean waves generated near the equator

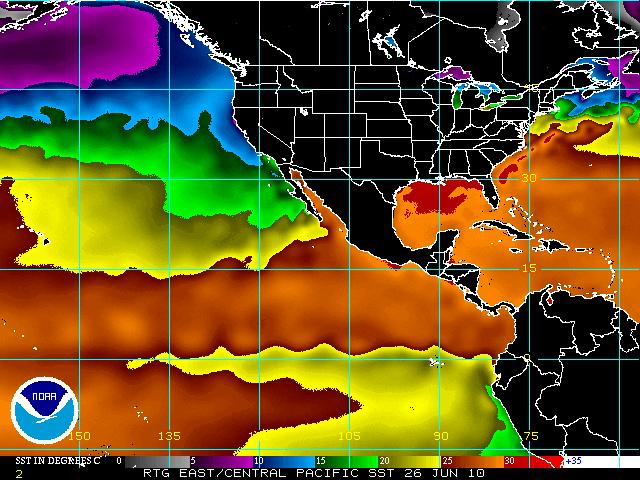
A plot of Pacific sea surface temperatures on June 26, 2010. Tropical instability waves are visible as north–south deflections of the tongue of cold water that extends along the equator. These waves propagate westward with a period of about 30 days.

Tropical instability waves, often abbreviated TIW, are a phenomenon in which the interface between areas of warm and cold sea surface temperatures near the equator form a regular pattern of westward-propagating waves. These waves are often present in the Atlantic Ocean, extending westward from the African coast, but are more easily recognizable in the Pacific, extending westward from South America. They have an average period of about 30 days and wavelength of about 1100 kilometers, and are largest in amplitude between June and November. They are also largest during La Niña conditions, and may disappear when strong El Niño conditions are present.

Tropical instability waves are not related to tropical waves, which are atmospheric disturbances that propagate westward along the Intertropical Convergence Zone, sometimes giving rise to tropical storms.

== Background ==
In both the Atlantic and Pacific oceans, a tongue of cold surface water usually extends westward along the equator from the continental margins. These "cold tongues" consist of water upwelling from the ocean depths, and are surrounded by warmer surface water in both hemispheres. The temperature difference between the cold tongues and the surrounding warm water is largest during the southern hemisphere winter. The Pacific cold tongue is considerably stronger than the Atlantic one, and has a major influence on global climate patterns. In fact, the temperature of the Pacific cold tongue is the defining feature of the ENSO (El Niño-Southern Oscillation). An El Niño condition is officially recognized when the mean sea surface temperature in the Pacific cold tongue is more than 0.5 °C above average for a given time of year, whereas a La Niña condition is recognized when the temperatures are more than 0.5 °C below average.

Frequently the cold tongues do not extend in a straight line, but instead deflect to the north and south in a pattern of regular sinusoidal waves with a wavelength of about 1100 kilometers, which propagate steadily westward with a period of about 30 days. This wave pattern was first recognized in 1977 using satellite images, by R. Legeckis, who called them "long waves". The term "tropical instability waves" is attributed to a 1986 paper by S. G. H. Philander, W. J. Hurlin, and R. C. Pacanowski, who explained the existence and basic properties of the waves using a mathematical model of ocean heat flow.

== Properties ==
Microwave satellite observations indicate that in the Pacific, TIW on the northern interface of the cold tongue begin as small cusps near the longitude of the Galapagos, which grow rapidly as they propagate westward. These cusps give rise to swirls of cold water that rotate anticyclonically off the tips. On the southern interface, TIW usually start later in the season, and also give rise to anticyclonic swirls. When the waves are strongest, they can extend almost all the way across the Pacific to Indonesia. In the Atlantic, TIW are also associated with anticyclonic swirls in the north, but rotating currents at the southern edge can only be detected in the chlorophyll signal of ocean color.

There is some evidence that TIW may be strong enough to have significant effects on weather and biology. The sea temperature fluctuations give rise to surface wind speed variations, and also to observable fluctuations in chlorophyll levels and other parameters that indicate differences in the density of photosynthesizing organisms. In particular they are associated with strong vertical mixing events that deepen the equatorial mixed layer and cause the strong SST front north of the equator.

Mathematical modeling studies indicate that TIW are generated by velocity shear between the westward-flowing South Equatorial Current and the eastward flowing Equatorial Undercurrent and Equatorial Countercurrent.
