= 1990–1995 El Niño events =

Warming of the eastern Pacific Ocean

Between 1990 and 1995, the Pacific Ocean experienced various atmospheric and oceanic features, which were consistent with an El Niño event.

Beginning in early 1991, a moderate-to-strong Central Pacific based El Niño developed. From there, the event lasted from most of 1991 until about late spring or summer 1992. The ENSO Modoki event, along with the 1991 eruption of Mount Pinatubo, caused global cooling in both 1991 and 1992.

In late summer 1992, not long after the event faded, the Pacific Ocean went under ENSO neutral conditions.

Fall 1992 and the winter of 1992--1993 turned very wet for the Great Plains and the Midwestern United States. The rainfall and snowfall overall during the period were higher than usual. Making matters worse, another Central Pacific El Niño developed in spring 1993. In particular, the severe flooding in 1993 caused $15 billion to just under $17 billion in damage and killed almost fifty people. Furthermore, 1993 was one of the wettest years to happen for the Midwestern United States and the Great Plains.

The following year, 1994, was when yet another El Niño developed during mid-spring and lasted until almost the autumn.

In the Pacific, after 1994's El Niño had faded, the Pacific Ocean was once again ENSO neutral (there is speculation which says the period might have been borderline El Niño although not warm enough for an actual such event). Following the neutral pattern during the winter season of 1994–95 into the spring of 1995, a weak La Niña, which would last from 1995 until the first three quarters of 1996, began developing in the Pacific.

== Meteorological progression ==
=== 1989/1990 ===
- The 1988–1989 La Niña event weakened throughout 1989, with conditions returning towards normal values.
- During November 1989, researchers at the Shanghai Astronomical Observatory suggested that an El Niño had been developing since the previous event in 1986-88, forecasted it to peak in the second half of 1990 and that it might last until 1991.
- Between November 1989 and March 1990, parts of the Pacific Ocean started to experience various atmospheric and oceanic features, which were consistent with what had been observed at the start of previous El Niño events. These included an abnormal warming of its sea surface, persistent westerly wind bursts, atmospheric convection developing near the equator and the Southern Oscillation Index falling into negative values. As a result of these conditions, it was thought that an event was either underway or could develop during the latter part of 1990, however, others argued that the warming would only be temporary and that there would not be an El Nino during 1990. Over the next few months, sea surface temperatures across the Pacific continued to be slightly warmer than average, while indicators of a developing El Niño in the atmosphere faded as the Southern Oscillation Index rose to fluctuate near zero.

=== 1991 ===
- 2 April-2 September 1991: Mount Pinatubo erupted, causing global cooling.

=== 1995 ===
During the first few months of 1995, the El Niño weakened considerably with sea surface temperature anomalies decreasing through the equatorial Pacific, while atmospheric convection returned to its normal pattern. The Southern Oscillation Index also increased to near zero, while low-level easterly winds also increased to normal levels.
