= Walker circulation =

Theorerical model of air flow in the atmosphere

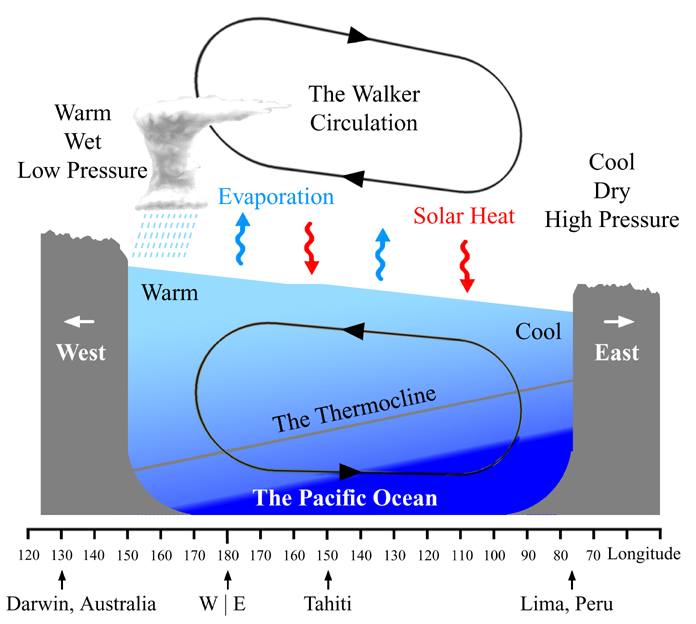
A schematic diagram of the quasi-equilibrium and La Niña phase of the southern oscillation. The Walker circulation is seen at the surface as easterly trade winds which move water and air warmed by the sun towards the west. The western side of the equatorial Pacific is characterized by warm, wet low pressure weather as the collected moisture is dumped in the form of typhoons and thunderstorms. The ocean is some 60 cm higher in the western Pacific as the result of this motion. The water and air are returned to the east. Both are now much cooler, and the air is much drier. An El Niño episode is characterised by a breakdown of this water and air cycle, resulting in relatively warm water and moist air in the eastern Pacific.

The Walker circulation, also known as the Walker cell, is a conceptual model of the air flow in the tropics in the lower atmosphere (troposphere). According to this model, parcels of air follow a closed circulation in the zonal and vertical directions. This circulation, which is roughly consistent with observations, is caused by differences in heat distribution between ocean and land. In addition to motions in the zonal and vertical direction the tropical atmosphere also has considerable motion in the meridional direction as part of, for example, the Hadley Circulation.

The Walker circulation is associated with the pressure gradient force that results from a high pressure system over the eastern Pacific Ocean, and a low pressure system over Indonesia. The Walker circulations of the tropical Indian, Pacific, and Atlantic basins result in westerly surface winds in northern summer in the first basin and easterly winds in the second and third basins. As a result, the temperature structure of the three oceans display dramatic asymmetries. The equatorial Pacific and Atlantic both have cool surface temperatures in northern summer in the east, while cooler surface temperatures prevail only in the western Indian Ocean. These changes in surface temperature reflect changes in the depth of the thermocline.

Changes in the Walker circulation with time occur in conjunction with changes in surface temperature. Some of these changes are forced externally, such as the seasonal shift of the sun into the Northern Hemisphere in summer. Other changes appear to be the result of coupled ocean-atmosphere feedback in which, for example, easterly winds cause the sea surface temperature to fall in the east, enhancing the zonal heat contrast and hence intensifying easterly winds across the basin. These anomalous easterlies induce more equatorial upwelling and raise the thermocline in the east, amplifying the initial cooling by the southerlies. From an oceanographic point of view, the equatorial cold tongue is caused by easterly winds. Were the Earth climate symmetric about the equator, cross-equatorial wind would vanish, and the cold tongue would be much weaker and have a very different zonal structure than is observed today.

The term "Walker Circulation" refers to Gilbert Walker who discovered the Southern Oscillation during the early twentieth century. The term was first used in 1969 by the Norwegian-American meteorologist Jacob Bjerknes to refer to his proposed east-west overturning circulation close to the Equator in the Pacific. The region of sinking air, which he called the arid zone, was flanked to the north and south by the cloud bands of the Inter-Tropical Convergence Zones. These he proposed were "the equatorial edges of the Hadley Circulation of the Northern and Southern Hemispheres".

As originally proposed, the Walker Circulation is weaker during El Niños, when the temperature gradient across the Pacific and the strength of the easterlies are both reduced, and stronger during La Niñas, when the opposite is true. In modern use, the term "Walker Circulation" may refer to a much greater range of latitudes and longitudes, and may include more than one region of overturning circulation.

== Walker's methodology ==
Gilbert Walker was an established applied mathematician at the University of Cambridge when he became director-general of observatories in India in 1904. While there, he studied the characteristics of the Indian Ocean monsoon, the failure of whose rains had brought severe famine to the country in 1899. Analyzing vast amounts of weather data from India and the rest of the world, over the next fifteen years he published the first descriptions of the great seesaw oscillation of atmospheric pressure between the Indian and Pacific Ocean, and its correlation to temperature and rainfall patterns across much of the Earth's tropical regions, including India. He also worked with the Indian Meteorological Department especially in linking the monsoon with Southern Oscillation phenomenon. He was made a Companion of the Order of the Star of India in 1911.

Walker determined that the time scale of a year (used by many studying the atmosphere) was unsuitable because geospatial relationships could be entirely different depending on the season. Thus, Walker broke his temporal analysis into December–February, March–May, June–August, and September–November.

Walker then selected a number of "centers of action", which included areas such as the Indian Peninsula. The centers were in the hearts of regions with either permanent or seasonal high and low pressures. He also added points for regions where rainfall, wind or temperature was an important control.

He examined the relationships of the summer and winter values of pressure and rainfall, first focusing on summer and winter values, and later extending his work to the spring and autumn.

He concludes that variations in temperature are generally governed by variations in pressure and rainfall. It had previously been suggested that sunspots could be the cause of the temperature variations, but Walker argued against this conclusion by showing monthly correlations of sunspots with temperature, winds, cloud cover, and rain that were inconsistent.

Walker made it a point to publish all of his correlation findings, both of relationships found to be important as well as relationships that were found to be unimportant. He did this for the purpose of dissuading researchers from focusing on correlations that did not exist.

== Oceanic effects ==
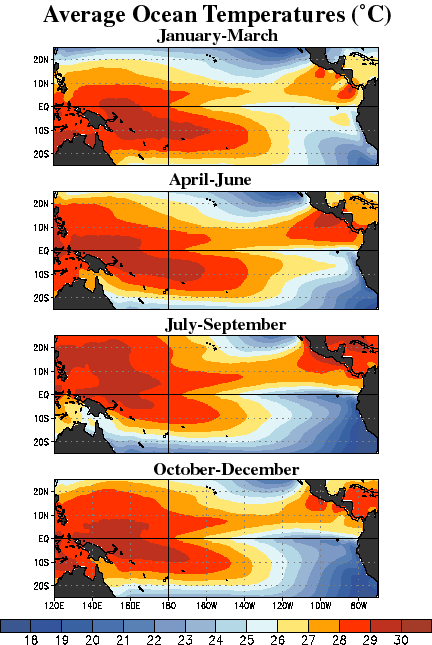
Average equatorial Pacific temperatures

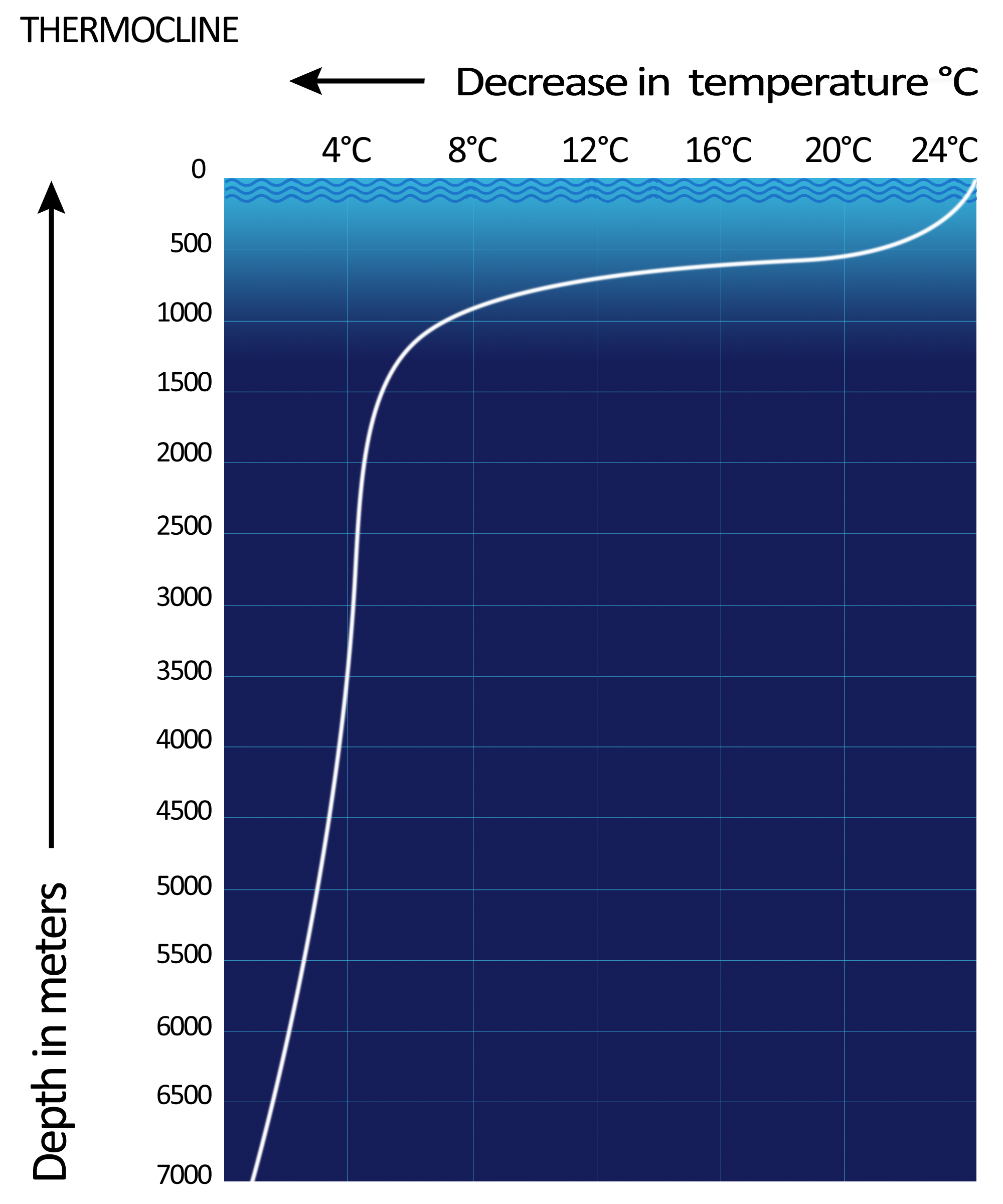
Graph showing a tropical ocean thermocline (depth vs. temperature). Note the rapid change between 100 and 1000 meters. The temperature is nearly constant after 1500 meters depth.

The Walker Circulations of the tropical Indian, Pacific, and Atlantic basins result in westerly surface winds in Northern Summer in the first basin and easterly winds in the second and third basins. As a result, the temperature structure of the three oceans display dramatic asymmetries. The equatorial Pacific and Atlantic both have cool surface temperatures in Northern Summer in the east, while cooler surface temperatures prevail only in the western Indian Ocean. These changes in surface temperature reflect changes in the depth of the thermocline.

Changes in the Walker Circulation with time occur in conjunction with changes in surface temperature. Some of these changes are forced externally, such as the seasonal shift of the Sun into the Northern Hemisphere in summer. Other changes appear to be the result of coupled ocean-atmosphere feedback in which, for example, easterly winds cause the sea surface temperature to fall in the east, enhancing the zonal heat contrast and hence intensifying easterly winds across the basin.

These enhanced easterlies induce more equatorial upwelling and raise the thermocline in the east, amplifying the initial cooling by the easterlies. This coupled ocean-atmosphere feedback was originally proposed by Bjerknes. From an oceanographic point of view, the equatorial cold tongue is caused by easterly winds.

Were the earth's climate symmetric about the equator, cross-equatorial wind would vanish, and the cold tongue would be much weaker and have a very different zonal structure than is observed today. The Walker cell is indirectly related to upwelling off the coasts of Peru and Ecuador. This brings nutrient-rich cold water to the surface, increasing fishing stocks.

== El Niño–Southern Oscillation ==
The Walker circulation is caused by the pressure gradient force that results from a high pressure system over the eastern Pacific Ocean and a low pressure system over Indonesia. The Walker circulation causes an upwelling of cold deep sea water, thus cooling the sea surface. El Niño results when this circulation decreases or stops, as the impaired or inhibited circulation causes the ocean surface to warm to above average temperatures. A markedly increased Walker circulation causes a La Niña by intensifying the upwelling of cold deep sea water; which cools the sea surface to below average temperatures.

During non-El Niño conditions, the Walker circulation is seen at the surface as easterly trade winds that move water and air warmed by the sun toward the west. This also creates ocean upwelling off the coasts of Peru and Ecuador and brings nutrient-rich cold water to the surface, increasing fishing stocks. The western side of the equatorial Pacific is characterized by warm, wet, low-pressure weather as the collected moisture is dumped in the form of typhoons and thunderstorms. The ocean is some 60 cm (24 in) higher in the western Pacific as the result of this motion.

A scientific study published in May 2006 in the journal Nature indicates that the Walker circulation has been slowing since the mid-19th century. The authors argue that global warming is a likely causative factor in the weakening of the wind pattern. However, a 2011 study from The Twentieth Century Reanalysis Project shows that, aside from El Niño–Southern Oscillation cycles, the overall speed and direction of the Walker circulation remained steady between 1871 and 2008.

== See also ==
- Atmospheric circulation
- Earth's atmosphere

== General references ==
- Walker Institute, University of Reading, UK. http://www.walker-institute.ac.uk/about/sir_gilbert.htm
- Walker, JM. Pen Portrait of Sir Gilbert Walker, CSI, MA, ScD, FRS. Weather 1997 (Volume 52, No.7, pp. 217–220)
- Walker, G.T. and Bliss, E.W., 1930. World Weather IV, Memoirs of the Royal Meteorological Society, 3, (24), 81–95.
- Walker, G.T. and Bliss, E.W., 1937. World Weather VI, Memoirs of the Royal Meteorological Society, 4, (39), 119–139.
- Walker, G.T., 1923. Correlation in seasonal variations of weather, VIII. A preliminary study of world weather. Memoirs of the India Meteorological Department, 24, (4), 75–131.
- Walker, G.T., 1924. Correlation in seasonal variations of weather, IX. A further study of world weather. Memoirs of the India Meteorological Department, 24, (9),275–333. http://www.rmets.org/about/history/classics.php
- Katz, R.W. Sir Gilbert Walker and a Connection between El Nino and Statistics. Statistical Science, 17 (2002), 97–117. http://amath.colorado.edu/courses/4540/2004Spr/walkerss.pdf
- Climate research summary – Walker Circulation: a tropical atmospheric circulation slow-down Text and graphics from NOAA / Geophysical Fluid Dynamics Laboratory
- Slowdown in tropical Pacific flow pinned on climate change – press release from University Corporation for Atmospheric Research.
- Weakening of tropical Pacific atmospheric circulation due to anthropogenic forcing 4 May 2006 in Nature.
- Associated Press news story, 3 May 2006: "Global Warming Cited in Wind Shift"
- Tropical convective transport and the Walker circulation, 29 October 2012 in Atmospheric Chemistry and Physics
