= Temperature anomaly =

Difference of a temperature from a reference value

Various global surface temperature datasets originally had different reference periods, but for meaningful comparison have been adjusted to have the same "0 °C" reference temperature. Without such an adjustment, the traces would be vertically offset from each other. Here, the "0 °C" value is determined based the average for 1850-1900—considered to be the "pre-industrial" temperature—and does not indicate an absolute measured temperature of "0 °C".

Temperature anomaly is the difference, positive or negative, of a temperature from a base or reference value, normally chosen as an average of temperatures over a certain reference or base period. In atmospheric sciences, the average temperature is commonly calculated over a period of at least 30 years over a homogeneous geographic region, or globally over the entire planet.

Temperatures are obtained from surface and offshore weather stations or inferred from meteorological satellite data. Temperature anomalies can be calculated based on datasets of near-surface and upper-air atmospheric temperatures or sea surface temperatures.

== Description ==
Temperature anomalies are a measure of temperature compared to a reference temperature, which is often calculated as an average of temperatures over a reference period, often called a base period. Records of global average surface temperature are usually presented as anomalies rather than as absolute temperatures.

Using reference values computed for distinct areas over the same time period establishes a baseline from which anomalies are calculated, so that normalized data is used to more accurately compare temperature patterns to what is normal. For example, sub-global datasets may be for land-only, ocean-only, and hemispheric time series. Anomalies provide a frame of reference that allows more meaningful comparisons between locations and more accurate calculations of temperature trends.

Using different base periods does not change the shape of time series charts or affect portrayal of the trends within them. For example, World Meteorological Organization (WMO) policy motivates use of a 30 year base period, whereas for conceptual simplicity a century-long base period is sometimes used to track the big-picture evolution of temperatures across the entire global surface. Different meteorological organizations have used respective base periods for global mean surface temperature datasets, such as 1951–1980 (NASA GISS and Berkeley Earth), 1961–1990 (HadCRUT U.K.), 1901–2000 (NCDC/NOAA), and 1991–2020 (Japan Met).

=== Standard deviation ===
Though northern America has warmed more than its tropics, the tropics have more clearly departed from normal historical variability (coloured bands: 1σ, 2σ standard deviations). The two charts have the same reference period.

Anomalies alone are not sufficient to characterize exceptionality of temperature values. The standard deviation—symbolized by a lower case sigma, σ—quantifies the degree of variation of a dataset's values (see coloured bands in chart at right). For example, a variation of +2 °C can be more significant over a region with normally stable temperatures than another of +3 °C from a region with normally large variability. For this purpose, anomalies are often shown as 'standardized anomalies' namely the anomaly divided by the standard deviation.

To summarize: choice of reference period determines vertical placement of a trace on a graph, and deviation determines how much the trace is "stretched" in the vertical direction on the graph.

== Forecasting ==
Numerical weather prediction provides the temperature forecast for the next few days or weeks. This can be used to calculate anomalies during these forecast periods. There are two types of forecasts, deterministic and probabilistic, which will give different results.

Deterministic data are values obtained by running the forecast model with initial conditions determined by the initial conditions from data assimilation. Probabilistic data comes from predicting sets where the model (or different models) is run several times with a slight variations in the initial conditions each time.

Deterministic anomalies have a standard deviation which depends only on the bias of the forecast. The deviation and the probabilistic anomalies, being calculated from several model solutions, are themselves probabilities that they will occur.

== See also ==
- Extreme weather
- Heat wave
- Marine heatwave
