= 2023–2024 El Niño event =

Meteorological event

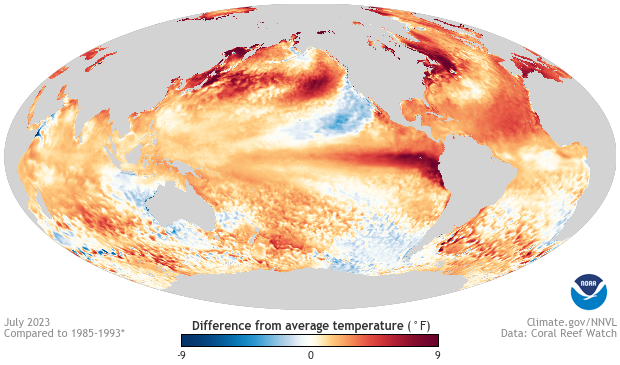
- Sea surface anomalies across the world in July 2023 during the 2023–2024 El Niño event.

Meteorological history
- Formed: June 2023
- Dissipated: April 2024

Overall effects
- Damage: $103.3 billion
- Areas affected: The Pacific Ocean and surrounding areas

The 2023–2024 El Niño was regarded as the fifth-most powerful El Niño–Southern Oscillation event in recorded history, resulting in widespread droughts, flooding and other natural disasters across the globe. The onset was declared on 4 July 2023 by the World Meteorological Organization (WMO) It was estimated that the most significant meteorological effects would occur between November 2023 and April 2024 and their characteristics would be determined depending on each territory on the planet, within which droughts, heavy rains, wildfires, heat waves, tropical cyclones, flooding and changes in wind patterns. These events have already negatively affected the economic activities of agriculture and fishing, generating shortages and rising prices of food—especially rice, palm oil, sugar cane, soybeans and corn—and, therefore, an increase in food insecurity of the most vulnerable populations.

Climate scientists say the 2023–24 El Niño event, exacerbated by the climate change crisis, will likely raise average global temperatures beyond the record set in 2016—during the 2014–2016 El Niño event—and will set new records for temperature in 2024, exceeding the 1.5 °C (2.7 °F) increase since pre-industrial times. Indeed, global temperatures for 2024 were 1.55 °C (2.79 °F) above average, registering 2024 as the hottest year on record globally.

== Background ==
The 2023–2024 El Niño event was rated "strong", and contributed to a record-breaking global average surface temperature for the July 2023 to June 2024 time period.

El Niño is a natural climate event caused by the Southern Oscillation, popularly known as El Niño or also in meteorological circles as El Niño-Southern Oscillation or ENSO, through which global warming of the eastern equatorial Pacific Ocean results in the development of unusually warm waters between the coast of South America and the International Date Line. This phenomenon significantly affects the global average surface temperature of the planet. A large El Niño event can raise it by as much as a few tenths of a degree Celsius.

== Meteorological progression ==
During an El Niño event, the east–west trade winds die, generating warmer air temperatures in the eastern and central parts of the tropical Pacific. Warmer temperatures lead to warming ocean surface temperatures, leading to heavier rainfall and flooding in the eastern Pacific. Since there are no trade winds, the necessary rains do not form in the western Pacific, generating droughts in Asia and Oceania. The phenomenon has a recurrence of between 2 and 7 years, and can last from 9 to 12 months.

The combination of El Niño and above-normal temperatures in the Atlantic Major Development Region (MDR) tends to favor increased hurricane activity in the eastern Pacific.

At the beginning of the year, it was considered that the climatic conditions of the first quarter of 2023 pointed to the occurrence of a strong El Niño event, similar to those that occurred in 1982, 1997, and 2015. In mid-January 2023, weather forecasts regarding the probable occurrence of the El Niño phenomenon in 2023 and 2024 were published in various media. Given that Earth's average temperature has already increased by 1.2 °C since pre-industrial times, a large enough El Niño event in 2023–2024 could even push the planet, temporarily, into warming greater than 1.5 °C.

== Timeline ==
On 8 June, the National Oceanic and Atmospheric Administration (NOAA) of the United States confirmed the presence of El Niño. 4 July was declared the start date of the 2023–2024 El Niño event by the World Meteorological Organization (WMO).

During the months of June and July 2023 the global surface air temperature was warmer than the corresponding month of any previous year. Every month from June 2023 onwards set a new monthly temperature record, and 2023 was by far the warmest year recorded to that point. The WMO's Secretary-General, Celeste Saulo, said that El Niño had contributed to those temperatures but that greenhouse gases from human activity were "unequivocally the main culprit".

The event peaked in December 2023 as one of the five strongest El Niño events on record.

By early March 2024, pockets of below average Sea Surface Temperature SST Anomalies pierced the surface in the equatorial East Pacific, a clear sign that the El Niño event was in full retreat. In a statement of 5 March 2024 the WMO put the chance of El Niño persisting through March to May at about 60 per cent, and the chance of a return to neutral conditions between April and June at about 80 per cent.

Several severe thunderstorms bringing high winds and pea-sized hail hit Los Angeles, California, causing strong flooding in streets.

The event dissipated during April 2024, after which the tropical Pacific returned to neutral conditions. The Copernicus Climate Change Service later reported that 2024 had in turn become the warmest year on record, and the first calendar year in which the global average temperature exceeded 1.5 °C above the pre-industrial level.

In recent report, data from the Copernicus Climate Change Service showed that March 2024 was the warmest March on record around the globe. It was 1.68 °C (3.02 °F) warmer than pre-industrial times.

== Effects on tropical cyclone activity ==
Compared to previously strong El Niño events like 1982–83, 1997–98, and 2014–16, tropical cyclone activity in the North Atlantic was not suppressed much by the strong El Niño due to record warm sea surface temperatures in the Atlantic. The 2023 season went on to become the fourth most active Atlantic Hurricane season on record tied with 1933, and set an all time record high number of storms for an El Niño year. North Pacific tropical cyclone activity was more mixed. The North East Pacific was above average in terms of hurricanes, major hurricanes, and ACE, typical of previously strong El Niño event years, despite an exceptionally late start. The North West Pacific on the other hand observed well below average activity, mostly due to a consistently negative PDO environment, which suppressed the formation of a lot of tropical storms. While the activities in the North Pacific basins were a mixed bag, both basins proved to be extremely destructive in 2023, with Typhoon Doksuri in the North West Pacific and Hurricane Otis in the North East Pacific both causing more than $10 billion in damages each.

== Impact ==
=== Africa ===
El Niño caused severe flooding in East Africa, killing at least 479 people between September and mid-December 2023. Portions of southern and eastern Africa experienced drought, estimated to have affected more than 61 million people in southern Africa.

=== Asia ===
In April 2024, the India Meteorological Department (IMD) warned of heatwave conditions for 10 to 20 days in several parts of the country. The IMD said that the conditions would eventually subside with the onset of the neutral phase of the El Niño–Southern Oscillation and the monsoon in June. also heatwaves in Bangladesh it's one of the biggest effects of the climate change which caused the rise of heatstrokes, closure of Bangladesh's school and almost 33 million kids can't attend school because of this. United Arab Emirates also experienced extreme rainfall in March 2024, creating extreme flooding.

On 20 July, the Indian government banned the export of non-basmati rice, in order to seek to contain the rise in prices domestically and guarantee its availability in the domestic market due to the geopolitical scenario—especially the Russian invasion of Ukraine, the effect of El Niño and the extreme weather conditions generated by the climate crisis in other rice-producing countries. This decision would affect more than 42 countries importing rice from India, especially Bangladesh, Nepal, Benin, Senegal, Ivory Coast, Togo and Guinea. In 2022, India exported 10.3 million tons of non-basmati white rice, which represents a quarter of the total sales of the world's leading exporter of this grain.

During the month of August 2023, the absence of rain has been significant in general in the country, taking into account that August is the second rainiest of the year, after July, and during the monsoon. August 2023 is estimated to be the driest since meteorological parameters began to be recorded in 1901. In India, the impacts of El Niño develop in such a way that precipitation is suppressed in almost the entire country, except in the territories located in the east and northeast.

=== North America ===
Ahead of the 2023-24 North American winter, NOAA's Climate Prediction Center expected El Niño to favour warmer than average conditions across the northern tier of the United States and wetter than average conditions across the South, with the strongest signal for a wet winter in the Southeast. The outlook attributed this pattern to the enhanced southern jet stream and associated moisture typical of strong El Niño events, and anticipated that drought would ease across the Southeast, the Gulf Coast and Texas while persisting in the northern Rockies, the northern Great Plains and parts of the desert Southwest.

Ultimately, the winter ended up being the warmest on record across the United States, which was partially attributed to the El Niño conditions. Additionally, extreme and exceptional drought was nearly eliminated from the United States during the El Niño, and drought was significantly reduced, especially across the southern portions of the country.

=== Oceania ===
The Tonga Meteorological Service warned of an increased risk of cyclones and less rainfall. Unusually cold winter temperatures of 9.3 °C (48.7 °F) were observed in Tonga in July 2023, which were attributed to the El Niño event.

=== South America ===
World Meteorological Organization analyses indicated extreme heat and heatwave effects in central South America from August to December. Temperatures in parts of central Brazil exceeded 41 °C (106 °F) in August, which marks the middle of the winter in the southern hemisphere.

The 2024 Rio Grande do Sul floods in May of that year were caused by historical heavy rains and storms in the southern Brazilian state. Those events were thought by climatologists to have been intensified by the effects of climate change and the 2023–2024 El Niño event. The 2023 Rio Grande do Sul floods had already plagued the state during the prior month of September, a few months into the same El Niño event.

== See also ==
- Super El Niño events
