= 1877–1878 El Niño event =

Meteorological event

Meteorological history
- Formed: 1877
- Dissipated: 1878

Overall effects
- Fatalities: >50 million people
- Areas affected: Asia, South America, North America, Africa

The 1877–1878 El Niño event was likely the strongest El Niño on record. It contributed to widespread drought and famine in multiple countries, causing the death of more than 50 million people. Disasters associated with it include the Great Famine of 1876–1878 in India, the Grande Seca in Brazil, and the Northern Chinese Famine of 1876–1879.

== Development and strength ==
Drought hitting many tropical and subtropical areas starting in 1875 and climatic events in the Indian and Atlantic oceans were related to the developing El Niño. In North America, the winter was exceptionally mild and was known as the Year without a winter.

The 1877–1878 event likely surpassed all modern El Niño events in intensity, although there is much uncertainty in the measurement, that prevents making that conclusion with certainty.

The effects of the El Niño were compounded by other anomalous climatic conditions. The strongest Indian Ocean Dipole also occurred in 1877 and temperatures in the Atlantic were exceptionally high between 1877 and 1879.

A 2020 study found the 1877–1878 El Niño event was not significantly stronger than those of 1982–1983, 1997–1998, and 2014–2016.

== Impact ==
The event led to famines that killed more than 50 million people, about 3% of the global population of the time. Famines occurred in Brazil (Grande Seca), China (Northern Chinese Famine of 1876–1879), India (Great Famine of 1876–1878), Africa, and other areas. According to Deepti Singh et al., it "was arguably the worst environmental disaster to ever befall humanity". The impact was exacerbated by political and economic factors.

== See also ==
- Super El Niño events
