= Super El Niño events =

Global climate phenomenon

A visualization of sea surface temperature anomalies during the 1997–1998 Super El Nino event

Super El Niño events, officially called very strong El Niño events, or rarely called "Behemoth" El Niño events, are climatic phenomena resulting from the average sea surface temperatures in parts of the Pacific Ocean rising by 2° Celsius or more. Climate impacts from Super El Niño events can include widespread and severe flooding, drought and unseasonable temperature extremes, which can result in crop failures, food shortages, famine, disruption in water supplies, displacement, declines in native fauna, and an increased risk of wildfires and cyclones, which can contribute to economic disruption and civil conflict. As of September 2026, there have been six super El Niño events in recorded history. El Niño events prior to modern recordkeeping are sometimes identified by paleoclimatologists, historians and archeologists and are referred to as Mega-Niños.

== Background ==
El Niño is a natural climate event caused by the El Niño–Southern Oscillation (ENSO), through which warming of the eastern equatorial Pacific Ocean results in the development of unusually warm waters between the coast of South America and the International Date Line. This phenomenon significantly affects the global average surface temperature of the planet. A large El Niño event can raise it by as much as a few tenths of a degree Celsius.

A super El Niño occurs when the average sea surface temperatures (SST) in parts of the Pacific rise by 2° centigrade or more, mainly in Nino Indexes 3.4, 1, 2, 3, and 4, which are specific areas on the equator off the South American Pacific coast used by the National Oceanic and Atmospheric Administation and the World Meteorological Organization to define a Super El Nino event. Nino Index 3.4 is the main index used to officiate El Nino temperatures using Relative Oceanic Nino Index (RONI) values, spanning longitudes 170° West to 120° West longitude. The term "super El Niño" was first used in 2003 to describe an event in which "the surface zonal wind stress, SST, and the equatorial upwelling anomalies are proportionately large". The term is not an official designation of any agency but is an informal descriptor used by some forecasters; the NOAA's official terminology for 2° centigrade rise or more is "very strong El Niño".

== Frequency ==
Super El Niño events are not common, but have become more frequent from the last half of the 20th century. By the early 2020s scientists have predicted more frequent super El Niño events as variability in SSTs has increased since 1960.

== Impact ==
Super El Niños can cause widespread and severe flooding and drought and unseasonable temperature extremes, which can result in crop failures, food shortages, famine, disruption of water supplies, temporary or permanent population displacement, declines in native fauna, an increased risk of wildfires, cyclones, and disease outbreaks, and can contribute to economic disruption and civil conflict. They can also trigger climate regime shifts, lasting changes in weather patterns. Impact is most acute in regions of the Pacific Ocean, but are felt worldwide from changes in El Nino.

== Events ==
=== 1877–1878 ===
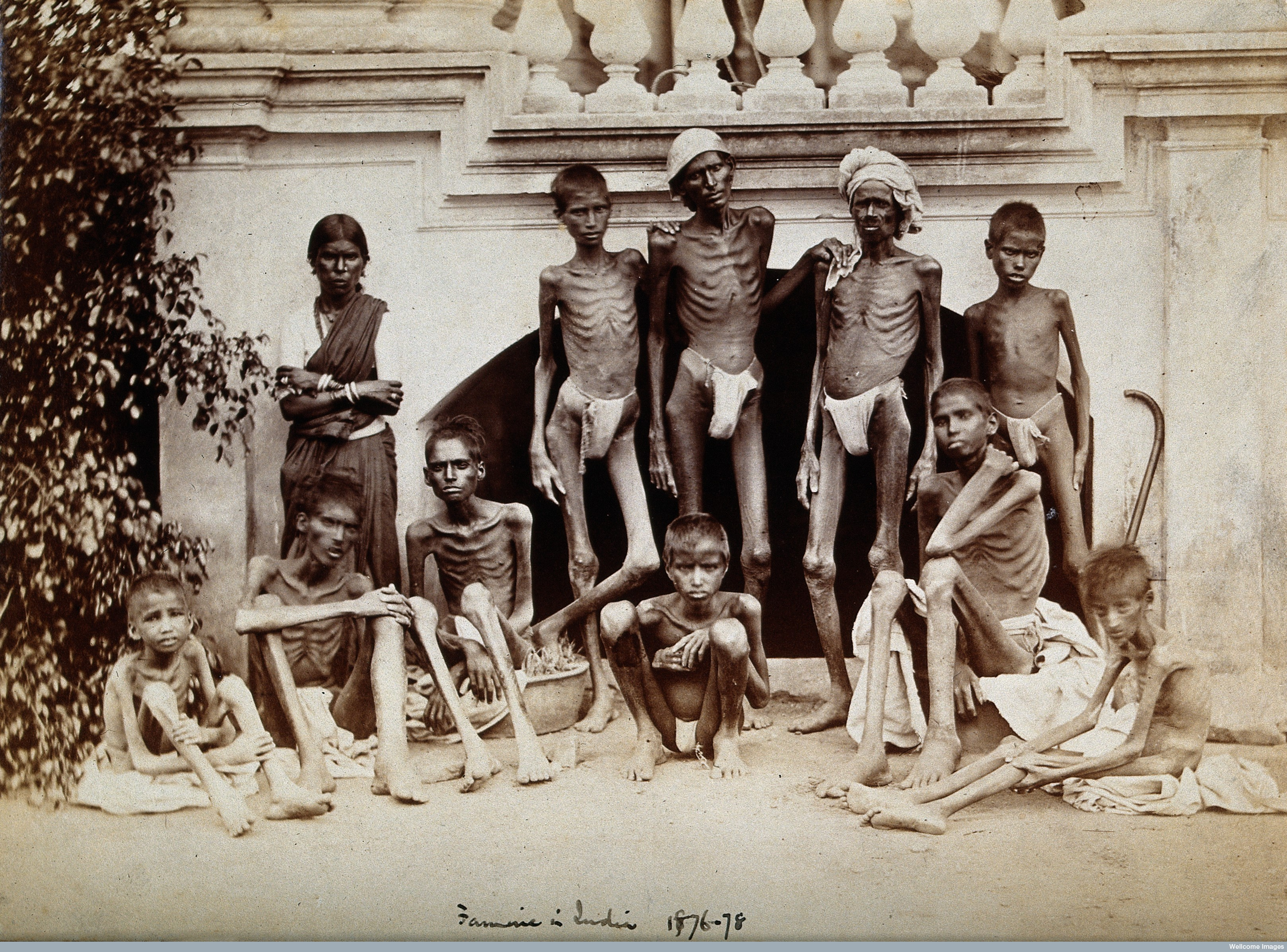
Victims of famine in India during the Great Famine

The strongest super El Niño on record as of early 2026 was the 1877–1878 event, which led to a global famine that killed more than 50 million people, or about 3-4 percent of the estimated global population, in disasters such as the Great Famine of 1876–1878 in India, the Northern Chinese Famine of 1876–1879, and the Grande Seca in Brazil. In North America the event was known as the Year without a winter because of unseasonably warm weather in certain areas.

=== 1982–1983 ===
The 1982–83 El Niño caused droughts in Africa, Indonesia and Australia, a warm winter in much of North America, Europe, and Asia, and heavy rains and flooding in South America. The event led to an upsurge in scientific interest in the phenomenon.

=== 1997–1998 ===
The 1997–1998 El Niño was regarded as one of the most powerful El Niño events in recorded history, resulting in widespread droughts, flooding and other natural disasters across the globe. It caused an estimated 16% of the world's reef systems to die, and temporarily warmed air temperature by 1.5 °C (2.7 °F) compared to the usual increase of 0.25 °C (0.45 °F) associated with El Niño events. The costs of the event were considerable, leading to global economic losses of US$5.7 trillion within five years. The 1997-1998 event increased public awareness and interest in the phenomenon. Global prediction models became available commercially.

=== 2014–2016 ===
The 2014–2016 El Niño developed from unusually warm waters developing between the coast of South America and the International Date Line. These unusually warm waters influenced the world's weather in a number of ways, which in turn significantly affected various parts of the world. These included drought conditions in Venezuela, Australia and a number of Pacific islands while significant flooding was also recorded. During the event, more tropical cyclones than normal occurred within the Pacific Ocean, while fewer than normal occurred in the Atlantic Ocean.

=== 2023–2024 ===
The 2023–2024 El Niño event was rated "strong", and contributed to a record-breaking global average surface temperature for the July 2023 to June 2024 time period.

The 2023–2024 El Niño did not quite reach official "Super" status; however it was regarded at the time as the fifth-most powerful El Niño event in since 1950, resulting in widespread droughts, flooding and other natural disasters across the globe. The onset was declared on 4 July 2023 by the World Meteorological Organization (WMO). It caused droughts in southern Africa, flooding in Brazil, and contributed to 2024's record high temperatures.

=== 2026–2027 ===
The 2026–2027 El Niño initially developed from a weak La Niña event in the beginning of 2026, transitioning to a neutral phase in March 2026 after two weak La Niña events followed the 2023–2024 El Niño event, and then officially transitioning to an El Niño phase in June 2026. Weekly Niño 3.4 Relative Oceanic Niño Index (RONI) values, which are used by the NOAA to determine the strength of an El Niño, reached 2°C on 14 September 2026, unofficially meeting the threshold criteria for a very strong El Niño, although in an average 3 month timespan, RONI values for index Niño 3.4 must average out at 2°C to be officially considered a very strong El Niño. Daily preliminary sea surface temperature anomalies in Niño region 3.4 reached 3°C on 15 September 2026, becoming one of two El Niños to reach daily SST anomalies of 3°C in this region since modern recording began in 1950, the other being the 2014–2016 El Niño. Forecasts have suggested peak monthly relative SST anomaly values in the Niño 3.4 region of around 3°–3.5°C, which would make this the strongest El Niño event ever recorded in 500-1000 years. On 5 October, average Nino 3.4 regional temperatures reached and surpassed 30°C for the first time in recorded history, reaching a maximum recorded temperature of 30.05°C, with a max SST anomaly of 3.4°C, becoming the strongest El Niño in recorded history in terms of maximum SST anomalies. The previous temperature record was held by the 2014-2016 El Niño, at 29.815°C. Effects of this El Niño are still ongoing and severe as of Late-October 2026, and forecasts still call for significant intensification.

== Mega-Niño ==
The term "Mega-Niño" was coined by archeologist Betty Meggers in 1994 to describe El Niño events that caused major effects over the past two millennia prior to instrumental recordkeeping and which can be identified by paleoclimatogologists, historians and archeologists from contemporaneous accounts and geologic evidence. A Mega-Niño is speculated to have contributed to the Permian–Triassic extinction event, the largest mass-extinction in Earth's history.
