= Cuba–Florida tornadoes of March 16–17, 1983 =

Severe weather event in the United States

Meteorological history
- Date: March 16–17, 1983

Tornado outbreak
- Tornadoes: 4 confirmed
- Max. rating: F2 tornado
- Highest winds: 98 mph (158 km/h) in Cuba on March 16

Overall effects
- Casualties: 1 fatality, 66 injuries (+1 non-tornadic)
- Areas affected: Cuba, South Florida

On March 16–17, 1983, a significant severe weather event affected the island of Cuba and the southern Florida peninsula, including the Miami metropolitan area. A total of at least four tornadoes affected these regions; while as many as 17 were reported in South Florida, only two were confirmed in the official National Weather Service records. The strongest tornado produced F2 damage on the Fujita scale and skipped across the Everglades region from the eastern Big Cypress National Preserve through the Everglades and Francis S. Taylor Wildlife Management Area to Lighthouse Point—a path length of nearly 53 mi (85 km). An F1 tornado also affected Naples and Golden Gate. Additionally, unconfirmed tornadoes affected an RV park southeast of East Naples, as well as the Stuart and Jupiter areas, respectively. In addition to tornadoes, severe thunderstorms produced hail to 1 in (2.5 cm) in diameter, as well as rainfall totals of 1 to 2 in (25 to 51 mm) in some areas. (Note: An outbreak is generally defined as a group of at least six tornadoes with no more than a six-hour gap between individual tornadoes; however, the threshold varies slightly according to local climatology. On the Florida peninsula, an outbreak consists of at least four tornadoes occurring relatively synchronously—no more than four hours apart.) (Note: The Fujita scale was devised under the aegis of scientist T. Theodore Fujita in the early 1970s. Prior to the advent of the scale in 1971, tornadoes in the United States were officially unrated. While the Fujita scale has been superseded by the Enhanced Fujita scale in the U.S. since February 1, 2007, Canada used the old scale until April 1, 2013; nations elsewhere, like the United Kingdom, apply other classifications such as the TORRO scale.) (Note: Historically, the number of tornadoes globally and in the United States was and is likely underrepresented: research by Grazulis on annual tornado activity suggests that, as of 2001, only 53% of yearly U.S. tornadoes were officially recorded. Documentation of tornadoes outside the United States was historically less exhaustive, owing to the lack of monitors in many nations and, in some cases, to internal political controls on public information. Most countries only recorded tornadoes that produced severe damage or loss of life. Significant low biases in U.S. tornado counts likely occurred through the early 1990s, when advanced NEXRAD was first installed and the National Weather Service began comprehensively verifying tornado occurrences.)

== Background ==
On Thursday, March 17, 1983, surface weather analysis indicated that a large and intense low-pressure area over the Gulf of Mexico was producing gale-force winds over the southern Florida peninsula. Above the surface, a strong low-level jet stream coupled with a large negative geopotential height—measuring standard deviations below normal—produced sufficient lifting and wind shear, both conditions conducive to severe weather. Due to the favorable conditions for severe weather, the National Weather Service office in Miami issued a tornado watch for South Florida, effective the morning of March 17. The watch was canceled at 9:30 a.m. EST (14:30 UTC), but then was reissued and extended to 5:00 p.m. (22:00 UTC) as more storms formed over the Everglades. Forecasters expected the low pressure area in the Gulf of Mexico to bring a cold front across Florida on Friday, March 18.

The tornadoes occurred during a strong occurrence of El Niño—a condition known to enhance severe weather over Florida.

== Confirmed tornadoes ==
Confirmed tornadoes by Fujita rating
FU	F0	F1	F2	F3	F4	F5	Total
2	0	1	1	0	0	0	≥ 4*

- At least three unconfirmed tornadoes were reported, two of them in Martin County and the other one in Collier County:

•A tornado reportedly affected the Hitching Post RV Travel Resort, near Naples Manor, causing $6,000 in damage to one trailer, tearing loose a carport from another, and felling trees and utility lines. Electricity was disrupted for four hours, leaving 300 residents powerless.
•Another possible tornado about 8:20 a.m. (13:20 UTC) overturned a vehicle on the Bee-Line Highway north of Indiantown Road, west of Jupiter, injuring one woman. The person was transported to a hospital, where she was treated and released.
•A third possible tornado touched down around 8:35 a.m. (13:35 UTC) in Stuart, damaging trees, downing branches, and destroying portions of tree trunks, along with a screened greenhouse. Florida Power and Light crews removed branches from electrical wires.

=== March 16 event ===
Confirmed tornadoes – Wednesday, March 16, 1983 (Note: All dates are based on the local time zone where the tornado touched down; however, all times are in Coordinated Universal Time and dates are split at midnight CST/CDT for consistency.) (Note: Prior to 1994, only the average widths of tornado paths were officially listed.)
F#	Location	County / Parish	State	Time (UTC)	Path length	Max. width	Summary
FU	Unknown (two tornadoes)	Unknown	Pinar del Río	Unknown	Unknown	Unknown	1 death – Multiple tornadoes destroyed or damaged 467 structures. Up to 64 injuries occurred, yet losses were unknown.

=== March 17 event ===
Confirmed tornadoes – Thursday, March 17, 1983
F#	Location	County / Parish	State	Start coord.	Time (UTC)	Path length	Max. width	Summary
F1	Naples to Golden Gate	Collier	FL	26.13°N 81.80°W	12:15–?	7 miles (11 km)	40 yards (37 m)	This tornado, the first of the day, touched down near Naples and moved northeast across the Naples airport, flipping a plane on its back. In Naples, the tornado also uprooted many trees. Next, the tornado tore the roof from a store in Golden Gate, blew an awning 600 ft (200 yd), snapped power poles, and downed wires. In Golden Gate, 1,800 residents lost electrical services for 40 minutes. After striking Golden Gate, the tornado apparently dissipated over rural, swampy areas. The touchdown may have occurred at 6:45 am, or more than one tornado was involved.
F2	Trailtown to Lighthouse Point	Collier, Dade, Broward	FL	26.13°N 81.80°W	12:49–?	52.5 miles (84.5 km)	60 yards (55 m)	See section on this tornado – 2 people were injured.

=== Monroe Station–Sunrise–Lauderhill–North Lauderdale–Margate–Pompano Beach–Lighthouse Point, Florida ===
Monroe Station–Sunrise–Lauderhill–North Lauderdale–Margate–Pompano Beach–Lighthouse Point, Florida
Meteorological history
- Formed: March 17, 1983, 7:49 a.m. EST (UTC−05:00)
- Dissipated: March 17, 1983, 8:52 a.m. EST (UTC−05:00)
- Duration: 1 hour, 3 minutes

F2 tornado
- on the Fujita scale
- Highest winds: 135 mph (217 km/h)

Overall effects
- Injuries: 2

The second tornado of the day was a long-tracked tornado that was probably a family of up to five tornadoes. The tornado, or the first member of its family, touched down near Trailtown at about 7:49 a.m. local standard time, though it may have formed farther southwest in the Everglades, as one person reportedly sighted a tornado as early as 7:30 a.m. EST. Upon touching down, the tornado damaged two bungalows owned by Seminole Indians. One trailer was destroyed, and TJ's Service Station in Monroe Station lost its roof when the tornado crossed Tamiami Trail, about 20 mi (32 km) east of Ochopee. Phone service was disrupted at the service station, where losses were estimated near $30,000. Two vehicles, one of which was a refueling van, were overturned, injuring two people. Additionally, electrical wires were damaged, a car was hurled into a house, and a dumpster was thrown 50 ft (17 yd).

The tornado moved northeast at 50 mph (80 km/h) across the Everglades, entering northwest Dade County and then southwest Broward County. Subsequently, the tornado struck the communities of Sunrise, Lauderhill, North Lauderdale, Margate, Pompano Beach, and Lighthouse Point. It first hit several homes and a recreation center in Sunrise, causing extensive damage. As it moved through Sunrise, the tornado downed power poles, wires, screen enclosures, trees, and mailboxes. Doors at the Sunrise city hall were blown open, allowing debris inside that covered the first floor of the building. Damage was widespread throughout the city, particularly along and near Oakland Park Boulevard (SR 816). At least three funnel clouds were reported in Sunrise, and at least one tornado touchdown was alleged. Windows were broken in hundreds of homes, while trees and power lines were prostrated. The mayor of the town of Sunrise, John Lomelo, declared a state of emergency in town, upon hearing of damage to city hall and across the city. Next, the tornado blew a porch from a home in Lauderhill. In North Lauderdale, the tornado damaged 30 to 40 homes in a four-block area, blowing awnings loose and uprooting trees. In Margate, the tornado affected the 600 and 700 blocks along SW 51st Avenue. A home was unroofed, another home lost most of its roof, and trees and power lines were downed. The tornado tore a bedroom door from its hinges, broke glass, and snapped a 40-foot-tall (12 m) Norfolk Island pine tree in half.

After hitting Margate, the tornado struck the Pompano Beach service plaza on Florida's Turnpike, overturning an 18-wheeler tractor trailer, uprooting trees, and blowing away signs. In this area, the tornado was estimated to have been 1/4 to 1/2 mi (0.40 to 0.80 km) wide. After hitting the service plaza, the tornado continued northeast to Golf View Estates, a mobile-home park north of Palm-Aire Country Club, damaging about 15 mobile homes, of which six to eight had major damage. Several mobile homes were unroofed. Near the intersection of Copans Road and Northeast Third Avenue, the tornado struck another mobile-home park, where its winds overturned a mobile home and moved another off its foundation. Trees in the park were snapped "like toothpicks," and a downed tree landed on a mobile home. Nearby, the tornado also broke glass in a two-story home. As it continued across north Pompano Beach, the tornado destroyed a satellite dish at a restaurant. The tornado continued northeast to Lighthouse Point, where a department store on Federal Highway had its roof damaged. Flying debris from the store also damaged nearby apartments. Nearby, windows were shattered in a public library, and a supermarket delivery truck carrying frozen food was overturned. The Lighthouse Point section of the path was described as having been being done by a separate tornado.

The Everglades–Lighthouse Point tornado featured the second-longest path recorded south of Lake Okeechobee; only one tornado in 1968 featured a longer path of 65 mi (105 km) in southern Florida.

== Non-tornadic effects ==
In Cuba, severe thunderstorms generated winds of 98 mph (158 km/h) at Varadero Airport on March 16. 12-to-15-foot-high (3.7 to 4.6 m) waves ravaged the Malecón in Havana, leading to flooding whose effects were described as "'unprecedented'." The combination of weather and tide wrecked 124 homes in Cuba. A day later, unusually cool temperatures in the upper levels of the atmosphere contributed to large hail in portions of South Florida, including the Miami area. Hail of 3/4 to 1 in (1.9 to 2.5 cm) in diameter was reported in Dade County—an unusually large size for hail in South Florida. In Miami Beach, hail larger than marble size fell, causing cuts and bruises to one person, who was treated for minor injuries. Up to 2 in (51 mm) of rain fell in Miami, while Fort Lauderdale received 1 in (25 mm). The heavy rains caused traffic congestion, and several accidents occurred. Severe winds were also reported elsewhere in the state, particularly near Daytona Beach. In Broward County, the strong winds downed live power lines and smashed cars' windows.

== See also ==
- List of North American tornadoes and tornado outbreaks

== Sources ==
- Brooks, Harold E. (April 2004). "On the Relationship of Tornado Path Length and Width to Intensity". Weather and Forecasting. 19 (2). Boston: American Meteorological Society: 310–19. Bibcode:2004WtFor..19..310B. doi:10.1175/1520-0434(2004)019<0310:OTROTP>2.0.CO;2.
- Cook, A. R.; Schaefer, J. T. (August 2008). "The Relation of El Niño–Southern Oscillation (ENSO) to Winter Tornado Outbreaks". Monthly Weather Review. 136 (8). Boston: American Meteorological Society: 3135. Bibcode:2008MWRv..136.3121C. doi:10.1175/2007MWR2171.1.
- Grazulis, Thomas P. (November 1990). Significant Tornadoes 1880–1989. Vol. 2. St. Johnsbury, Vermont: The Tornado Project of Environmental Films. ISBN 1-879362-02-3.
- Grazulis, Thomas P. (July 1993). Significant Tornadoes 1680–1991: A Chronology and Analysis of Events. St. Johnsbury, Vermont: The Tornado Project of Environmental Films. ISBN 1-879362-03-1.
- Grazulis, Thomas P. (2001a). The Tornado: Nature's Ultimate Windstorm. Norman: University of Oklahoma Press. ISBN 978-0-8061-3538-0.
- Grazulis, Thomas P. (2001b). F5-F6 Tornadoes. St. Johnsbury, Vermont: The Tornado Project of Environmental Films.
- Hagemeyer, Bartlett C. (September 1997). "Peninsular Florida Tornado Outbreaks". Weather and Forecasting. 12 (3). Boston: American Meteorological Society: 400. Bibcode:1997WtFor..12..399H. doi:10.1175/1520-0434(1997)012<0399:PFTO>2.0.CO;2.
- National Weather Service (March 1983). Storm Data Publication (Report). National Centers for Environmental Information – via Storm Events Database.
- National Weather Service (March 1983). "Storm Data and Unusual Weather Phenomena". Storm Data. 25 (3). Asheville, North Carolina: National Climatic Data Center.
