= Grande Seca =

Brazilian drought (1877–1878)

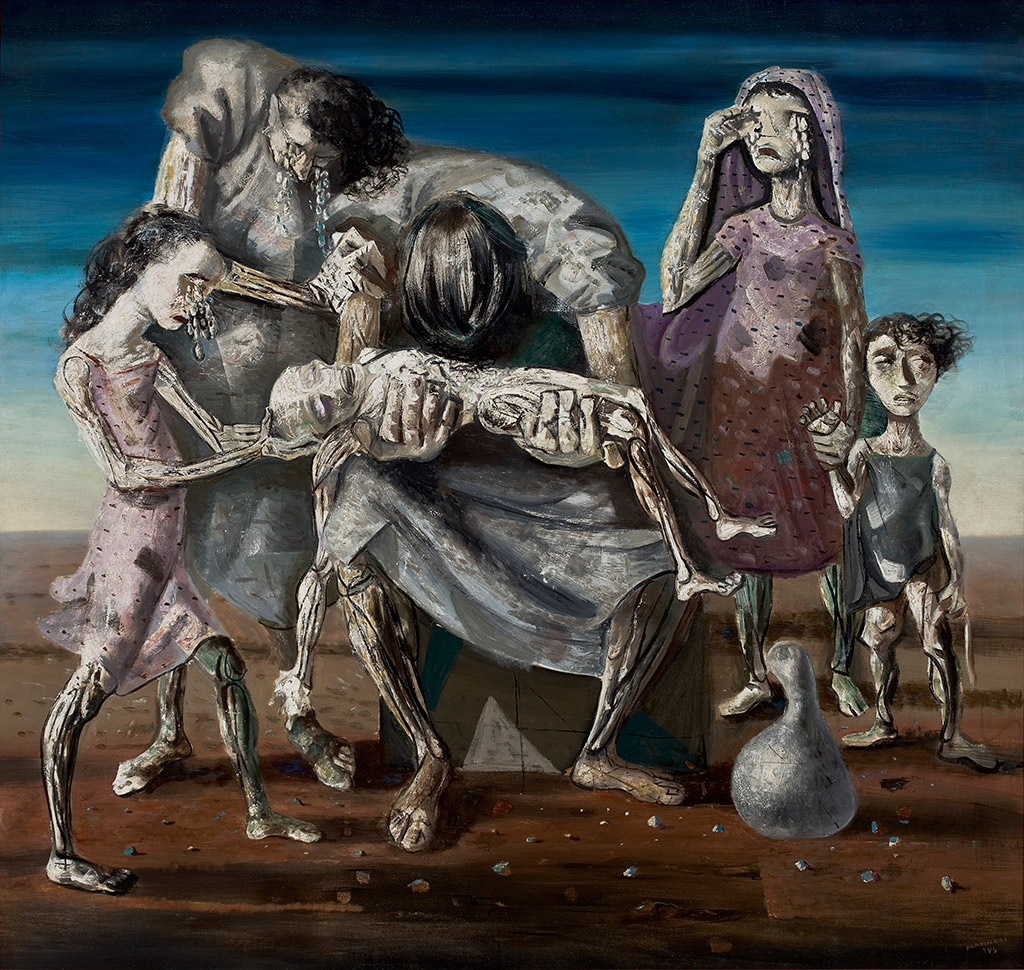
Criança Morta ("Dead Child"), 1944, by Cândido Portinari

The Grande Seca (English: Great Drought), or the Brazilian drought of 1877–1878, was the largest and most devastating drought in Brazilian history. It caused the deaths of between 400,000 and 500,000 people. Of the 800,000 people who lived in the affected Northeastern region, around 120,000 migrated to the Amazon while 68,000 migrated to other parts of Brazil.

The Grande Seca was exacerbated by poorly managed agriculture. Overgrazing, sharecropping, and lack of sustainable agricultural practice compounded the effects of the drought. The majority of the sertão population (sertanejos) were poor sharecroppers, who depended on the winter rains to provide water for crops and cattle. Without adequate preparation the peasants of the sertão were unprepared for extended drought and quickly began to starve.

Reactions to the disaster were almost nonexistent. Outside Brazil, news outlets briefly covered the drought. In the most-affected state of Ceará, many pleas for help were written to the Brazilian government, but these were mostly ignored because of political and social biases. When aid eventually arrived, it was poorly distributed. The eventual government response was a bureau to address future droughts in 1909 and building a reservoir.

== Causes and contributing factors ==
=== Environmental factors ===
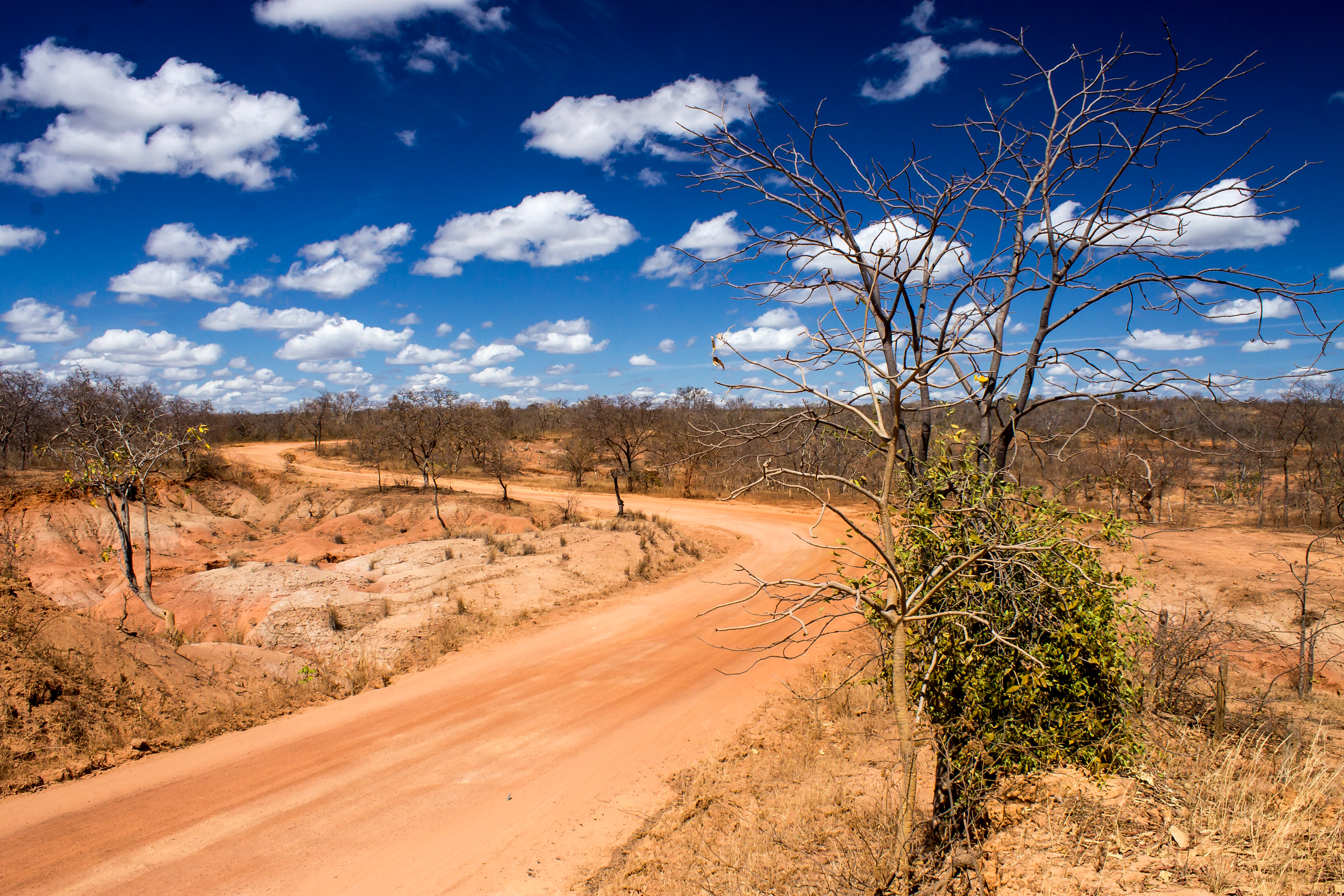
Brazilian sertão in the Northeast

The Brazilian Northeast is an area where political and social development has been hindered by the harsh environment of the arid sertão. Characterized by the presence of nine major rivers, among which are the São Francisco and the Parnaíba, the sertão has an average annual temperature of between 20 °C and 28 °C and a maximum of 40 °C. The pluviosity of the area is a source of concern for farmers and local governments alike. Although the annual average precipitation is slightly lower than 1,000 mm, the rainy period, which usually lasts just two months a year, is unstable. Sometimes precipitation halts for one year or more, often causing regional droughts. Sustained occurrences of below average water availability can happen in all areas of the country as a consequence of abnormally low precipitation rates and high evaporation rates; but it is in the Northeast where they happen with greater frequency. The zona da mata, which runs along the Northeastern coast and in which major cities are located. In this sub-biome, rains are frequent and vegetation is plentiful. This area does not usually suffer from droughts, but the magnitude of the Great Drought was so great that even the coastal region was impacted. Since the rivers that flow to the coast almost always have their origin in the sertão, a drought in the semiarid and arid sub-regions can extend to the entire Northeastern area. Prior to Portuguese settlement in the 16th century, there were no pressing problems because the predominant caatinga ecosystem was adapted to the cyclical climate. Indigenous groups who inhabited the land were affected by extreme droughts, which forced them to move to the humid coastal region, but these rarely occurred.

The Northeast is heavily influenced by the El Niño phenomenon and by the surface temperatures of the Atlantic Ocean. El Niño years are characterized by below-average rainfall in the semiarid zone, which typically averages at 800 mm annually but is concentrated in a brief time period sometimes shorter than two months. During extreme droughts, precipitation can decrease by more than 50%. As a direct consequence of variation in climatic patterns around the world in 1877 parts of Ceará witnessed four days of rainfall from March 18 to March 21. These rains allowed seeds to germinate, but it wasn't enough to sustain agriculture and cattle herds. Much of the vegetation quickly perished.

The situation created by increasing human migration to the Northeastern interior made the land more vulnerable to drought. The absence of water impacts agriculture first, but it also has economic, social, and environmental ramifications. Drought is now an integral part of the Northeastern environment and various episodes throughout history have caused serious damage to its states, though they are often forgotten once they pass. Agriculture and pasture outputs go back to normal, giving people a brief sense of security before the next drought arrives. This recurrence of events and behavioral stagnation was named the "hydroillogical cycle" by Professor Donald Wilhite of the University of Nebraska–Lincoln.

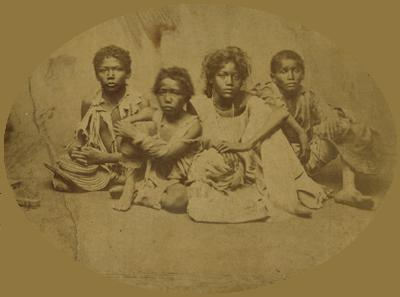
Children during the drought, 1878

At the time of the Great Drought, agriculture in the Northeast consisted mostly of sugarcane, cotton, and subsistence farming. The economic prosperity of the early 19th century called for an increase in arable land, which led to more soil erosion and contributed to the catastrophe of 1877–79. Public officials and experts pointed out the rotinismo—the idea of blindly following tradition without seeking improvement—as an issue which worsened the impacts of the Great Drought. One example of rotinismo is the heavy reliance on single crops, sugarcane and cotton namely, which speeds up soil erosion. Another instance is the lack of attempt to commercialize manioc, which could provide additional income and decrease the need for land usage. Additionally, sertanejos could not take advantage of any functional irrigation systems which they could use to store and ration water, due to lack of both government interest in the region and agricultural knowledge on the part of the farmers. The intensive, ill-suited monoculture and the absence of a robust network of artesian wells, dams, and reservoirs rapidly exacerbated the issues the Great Drought created.

Another concern were the vast cattle herds. Before the sugar boom of the 18th and early 19th centuries, cattle herds were predominantly found in the zona da mata. When farmers moved to the coast, the herds were pushed into the sertão which, as Kenneth Webb has argued, “is not really very good for cattle” but was adapted to this use. The cattle population also increased from 1.2 million in 1860 to 2 million in 1876. Legislation was introduced to limit the number of cattle but was largely ignored by farmers who relied on it as a vital source of food. Many hectares of land were required by one cow, and over-grazing easily led to increasingly rapid erosion. In 1877, when winter rains were late, much of the cattle and many crops were destroyed, the soil quickly eroded and the land became drier as a consequence. Ironically, during the early stage of the Great Drought there was abundance of dried beef, but that was the case only because people were killing cattle before the animals became totally unusable.

=== Social climate ===
At the time of the Great Drought, the regional difference between Northeast and Southeast was a significant factor in Imperial Brazil and exacerbated the environmental disaster. The Northeast had been the epicenter of the sugar-led economic boom of the 18th century and had also seen an increase in cotton production, which became one of the biggest exports by the 1800s. The Southeast, on the other hand, had developed less recently, and the independent coffee industry had taken over the market, dictating exchange rates and surpassing the once fervent sugar industry and the equally important cotton industry of the Northeast.

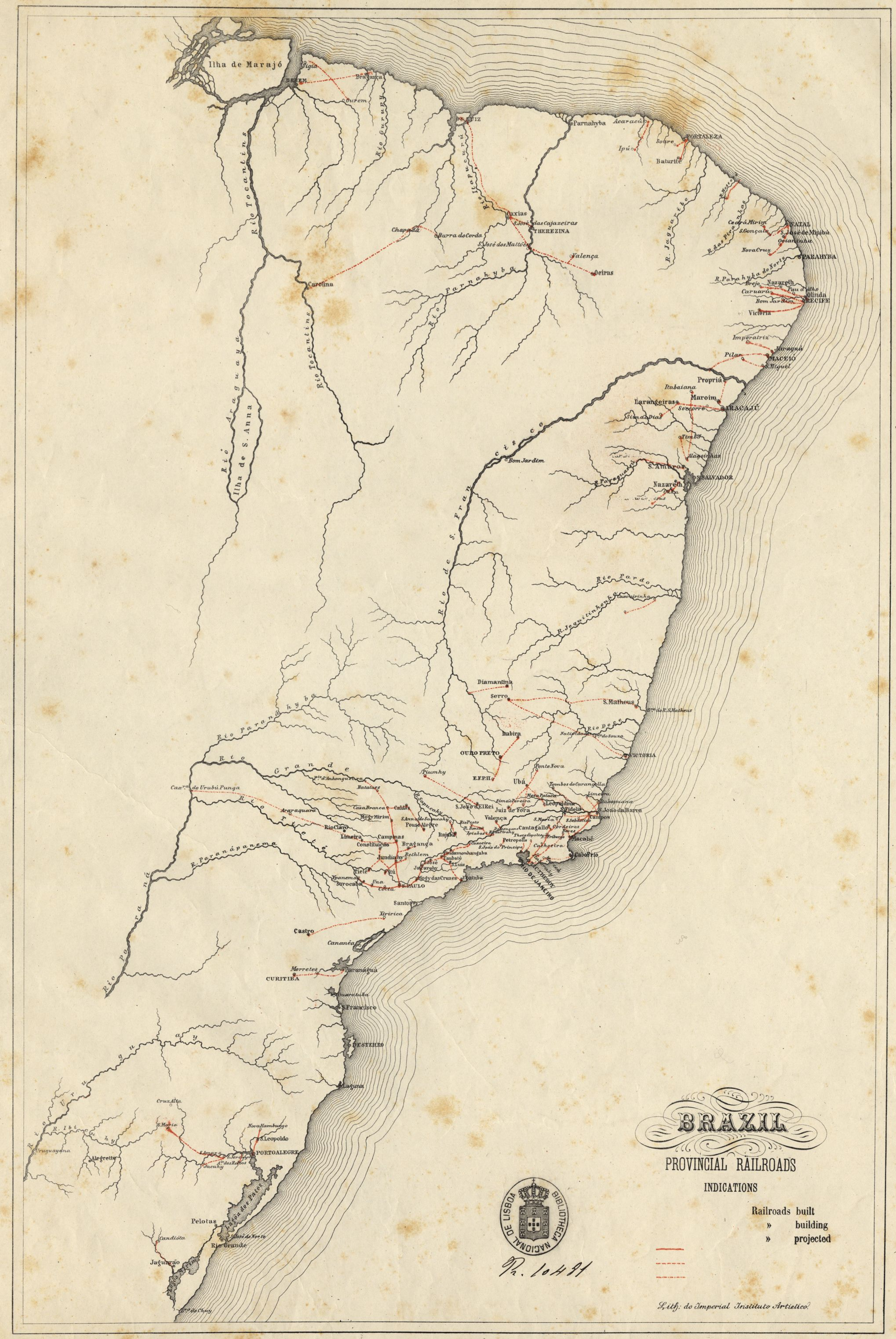
Railways in Brazil, 19th century

In 1870, the quality of life in the Northeast was similar to that of the South and Southeast; however, this changed very quickly as per capita income in the Northeast fell by 30%, whereas it remained virtually unchanged in the South. Unequal regional development in the 19th century can be seen in the appreciation and devaluation of products in the two regions. In Ceará, per capita product value went from £2.2 in 1872 to £0.8 in 1900, a change of -275%. In São Paulo per capita product value increased from £3.1 to £15.7, a +506% change in the same period.

In the 1870s, southern states turned their attention to immigration as a solution to the unavailability of labor for their fast-growing economy. Elites demanded that migrants be brought to the South not from Northeastern provinces but from European and Asian countries. The motivations behind this preference are not totally clear, but Leff and Deutsch blame the racial attitudes on the part of coffee planters who regarded sertanejos as lazy and less productive.

Infrastructure in the Southern regions was much more developed and efficient than in the poorer Northeastern states. The first railway was finished in 1854, connecting the Port of Mauá to Raiz da Serra in the province of Rio de Janeiro. By 1900, Brazil had some 20,000 km of track. As shown in Figure 1, the South had a more elaborate railway network which also contributed to the transportation of goods. In contrast, the Northeast's railroad complex was very limited, serving mostly coastal cities. By 1889, São Paulo, Rio de Janeiro, and Minas Gerais—the major coffee-growing provinces—had 65% of the total railroad tracks, compared to only 35% of the rest of the country. The lack of extensive railways in the Northeast meant slower locomotion of goods and people and higher transportation costs. Combined with the low number of navigable rivers and the precariousness of roads in the Northeast, the disparities between the two regions led to the aggravation of the drought.

Further, most public officials in the South believed that sertanejos were unwilling to work, which to them explained the slow dynamic of the Northeast's economy. However, experiencing the absence of infrastructural development first-hand, sertanejos thought that the Imperial government favored Southern states and offered them few if any opportunities to work and better the infrastructure they so desperately needed. The unavailability of government investment in the Northeast is partly due to financial hardships, but for many Northeasterners it was seen as a malicious attempt to slow down economic growth in their land.

As a result of regional economic and social inequality, tension between the provinces contributed to the ineffective management of the problems created by the Great Drought.

=== Economy ===
The Brazilian economy during the second half of the 19th century focused on exports of raw materials. The domestic market was underdeveloped due to lack of credit and the total self-sustainability of farmers, villages, and cities whose primary sources of food were subsistence agriculture and cattle herding. During the first half of the 19th century, the Imperial government allocated a significant amount of resources to building roads and ports. The former made inter-regional transportation much easier (though almost exclusively in the South) and the latter opened the door for foreign trade. For a country with limited capital, exports were fundamental for the survival of Brazil's economy. Sugar and cotton were main exports for much of the 18th century and the beginning of the 19th century. Coffee, however, made a grand entrance in the early 1900s and grew rapidly, due to, among other factors, the lack of notable competitors around the world, in contrast to the global sugar and cotton industries. It is worth noting that the cotton industry was booming in the 1860s as a consequence of the American Civil War and its repercussions on cotton markets in North America. This quick and illusory economic growth provided enough income to the Northeast but was followed by debt, entrenchment, and stress during the 1870s. With industrialization and the improvement of living standards in Europe and North America, coffee consumption expanded greatly. In the decade of the 1820s, coffee accounted for 19% of total exports, but by 1891, this share had risen to 63%. The product, produced almost exclusively in the three Southeastern provinces of São Paulo, Rio de Janeiro, and Minas Gerais, drove sugar and cotton prices down, dragging the Northeast's economy toward decline shortly before the drought.

As Brazil seceded from Portugal and declared independence, Britain began to shorten its distance from the newly independent nation, becoming its principal trading partner and informal protectorate by the mid-1800s. The clearest evidence of British hegemony was exhibited by the financial ties between the two Empires. Right before the Great Drought, 51% of imports came from Britain and 37% of exports were consumed by Britain. Trade deficits in Brazil were "repeatedly financed by punitive British loans whose interest payments generated permanent budget deficits which, in turn, were financed by yet more foreign bonds." The leading exporters were all British and most import houses were financed by British companies and specialized in British imports. Further, by 1870, four British companies owned 72% of Brazil's railroads, which had been subsidized by British capital. Economic dependence on the British Empire chained Brazil to financial policies that needed to protect British interests. Moreover, the banking system in Brazil was underdeveloped, with 13 out of 20 provinces having no local bank systems. The Bank of Brazil "confined itself to the conservative management of the money supply in the interest of British creditors." The total capital of the entire nation was £48 million, a trifling sum compared to the capital of British banks. Foreign banks were known for their unwillingness to "make long-term loans to agriculture or domestic concerns," conveniently neglecting Brazil when the need for investment was highest. Hence, the inability of the Brazilian government to implement infrastructure projects in many areas of the country was due to the suffocating nature of foreign debt—most of which was tied to Britain—the primitive banking system, and the volatility of its export income. This financial state contributed to the magnitude of the Great Drought in that it limited the economic growth of the Northeast, increased its people's vulnerability to drought, and made relief efforts more difficult to carry out.

== Charity ==
Although more of an exception, sertanejos were helped by some of the elite members, such as Rodolfo Teófilo, a pharmacist who developed a vaccine for smallpox and distributed it around the sertão. The majority of the initial aid for the victims of the drought was gathered through civilian charity. Some citizens in the provinces that were less affected, such as Pernambuco, created public subscriptions and sent the money and other relief items collected to the victims through ships without being charged for the transportation. However, the provisions bought were not necessarily "wisely purchased" and soon it became clear that only private charity was not enough to overcome the disaster.

== Reaction ==
The reaction across the world was muted. In Brazil, poor channels of communication and perceived superiority on the part of Brazil's politically dominant Southeast meant that reports of drought were largely ignored. Outside Brazil, pervasive Eurocentrism discouraged reporting on the disaster.

In areas of Brazil not affected by the drought, the initial reaction was nonexistent. Elites in southern Brazil saw the drought as a product of northeastern laziness. These elites cited the lack of infrastructure such as deep wells and dams, though construction of these projects was underway prior to the drought. Greenfield writes that Brazilian senators questioned the intelligence of the sertanejos by questioning why they hadn't built artesian wells. According to Greenfield, the senators' delusion stemmed from extremely different socio-political realities between themselves and the struggling population of the sertão.

The drought also brought an end to the popular belief of Brazilian exceptionalism with regard to tropical miasms. The dominant scientific discourse of the time stated that the climate of tropical countries made people lazy and unintelligent and allowed disease to fester. Brazil did not have major epidemics of smallpox, yellow fever, and cholera between the time of initial contact of Portuguese explorers with the indigenous population (from which the indigenous contracted diseases to which they had no resistance) and the drought. However, in 1878, epidemics swept Brazil.

The Great Drought marked the beginning of widespread use of drought relief for patronage. Relief was typically used to reward powerful supporters. Greenfield writes that leaders in local police forces were particularly prone to corruption as they were appointed by the local political leaders. Appointments were made as patronage to key supporters. Drought relief was a lucrative source of government funds, so relief panels commonly used it for their own enrichment.

Initially, those government funds were put toward resettling locals on plantations in the hopes of giving them self-sufficiency. Once they flooded the coastal cities and nearby sugar plantations, there was a glut of free labor. Many wealthy plantation owners sold their slaves and hired resettled people as sharecroppers.

In the rest of the world, the Great Drought was barely reported. Reporting was Eurocentric and the drought had not caused emigration from Brazil as the Irish Famine did. Sertanejos were typically internally displaced, with many moving to the Amazon in search of work harvesting rubber.

One in-depth article appeared in the New York Herald in 1879. Written by American naturalist Herbert Huntingdon Smith, the article described harrowing scenes of "living skeletons", crowded huts filled with migrants, and even cannibalism. The Herald article did not galvanize substantial international aid despite sensational depictions of the drought.

The Great Drought is mentioned twice in issues of the Mexican publication La Colonia Española. One article on world affairs reported that the drought was ongoing, while the other mention of the drought is in the context of a drought-resistant tree native to the sertão. In this context, the drought-resistant properties of the tree were the focus of the article rather than the drought itself.

== Government response ==
The Great Drought historically impacted Brazilian public policies related to drought. Greenfield mentions that "the roots of the very definition of drought and relief as national issues, date back to the Great Drought." The Brazilian government only recognized drought in the northeast as a national affair that should receive government attention after the Great Drought.

In October of 1877, the first positioning from the Empire to solve the drought was to form a commission with the objective of traveling around Ceará, studying the practical means of supplying enough water provision for the population and the cattle production during droughts, and establishing an irrigation system to always support the cultivation of the land. This commission was formed by members of the Polytechnic Institute of Rio de Janeiro and other intellectuals from the southeast.

The Southeastern intellectual class also formulated the government policies. Since these intellectuals were not in the region affected, they could not appreciate what was happening in the northeast, causing governmental aid to be insufficient, and even nonexistent in the initial months of drought. In fact, after receiving a call for help from some presidents of northeastern provinces, the Imperial government believed that the presidents of the provinces were abusing their relief budgets, and some in the Imperial government believed that the drought did not exist. Even some local politicians believed that the request for relief was premature, as rain could start at any time.

By the middle of 1877, the government invested two thousand contos of réis for relief, but due to lack of infrastructure, it was impossible to reach the remote areas. In January 1878, Joāo Lins Vieira Cansaçāo de Sinimbu, a liberal from Pernambuco, assumed the role of prime minister and created a program for public relief. Sinimbu's program was based on senator Pompeu's idea of lifting up the economic development of the drought region based on cheap and abundant workforce: the retirantes, drought refugees. The program distributed direct relief, such as food and water, as well as indirect relief, such as job opportunities, but only at the regions near the coast, causing an immigration wave to move to the coast.

These policies were influenced by the fact that the government was undergoing an economic deficit and facing the payment of foreign loans due the next year. Sinimbu's policies were also supported by a moral discourse also created by the elites. In the elite's perspective, the sertanejos were lazy, idle, vicious, and indolent. Therefore, the best remedy to overcome their laziness and save the government economy would be through "moralizing" work.

Retirantes' labor force was employed in the construction of roads, public buildings, railroads, and even makeshift work camps. As the refugees started to gather in the coastal cities, the government implemented another policy that sent the sertanejos to be used as cheap labor in the Amazon, for the extraction of rubber, and in the southeast, for the coffee production.

By June 1879, all relief governmental relief was discontinued, although the drought did not end until 1880. After the Great Drought, the northeast was constantly plagued by recurrent drought, (1888–89, 1900, 1903–04) and in 1909, the government created a Inspetoria de Obras Contra as Secas (IOCS). This governmental organ focused mainly on increasing water storage infrastructure, but even today the system continues to be insufficient to promote relief during drought.

The first large public construction responding to the drought is Cedro Dam, which was built in Quixáda, Ceará, between 1881 and 1906. Although the Cedro Dam is no longer being used, it plays an important role as the legacy of historical and cultural memories in Ceará.

== Emigration ==
As the living conditions in the sertão became even more difficult, emigration became the only option for the victims of the drought. By the middle of the summer, in Inhamuns' sertão, for example, only 10% of the population waited at their homes for the drought to be over. With the public policies encouraging emigration, retirantes fled to the coastal settlements, to the Amazon, to the Southeast, and to any other settlement in the Northeast that had not been affected by the drought.

The emigration provoked by the lack of supplies put pressure on areas that initially were not affected by the drought, causing the spread of the disaster and epidemics. The refugees' working conditions were filled with privation and disease, in particular the smallpox, and some policies did not allow sertanejos to receive food without working.

During the Great Drought, the refugees' workforce was employed the development of hydraulic projects, such as dams, weirs, and reservoirs, as well as railroad lines, under contracts with the private sector. Mike Davis claims that in the coastal areas of the northeast, as the number of retirantes was increasing, the elite preferred to risk the possibility of losing the surplus workforce over living under an "insurrectionary threat" as the victims assembled, and therefore supported the retirantes relocation to the Amazon.

== Death toll ==
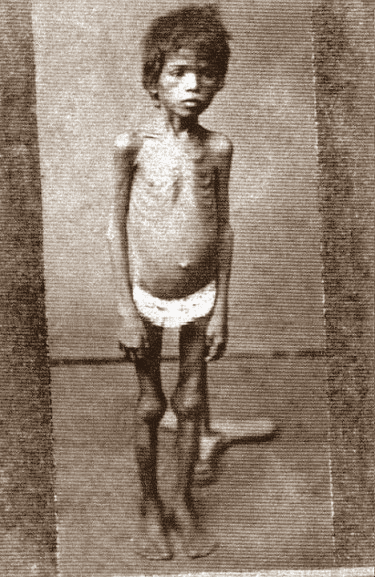
Malnourished child, Ceará, 1877. Picture by Joaquim Antônio Correia

There is no clear death toll, though a range can be ascertained through the examination of literature written in the late 1870s. Smith, who was on an expedition in Brazil when disaster struck, consequently wrote about the death he witnessed. He claimed "the entire mortality of Ceará" was nearly "500,000, or more than half the population." Smith also states, in an article written for the New York Herald, that "by the 20th of December, [1878] the death rate was 400 per day" in Fortaleza, a popular city for emigration within Ceará. But, as asserted by the Wellington Post, Fortaleza did not provide sanction for all: "at least 200,000 refugees," were forced to "encamp about the larger town," where the "famine mortality… [had] reached twenty per day." In total, the Wellington Post found that the "whole drought" resulted in "as high as 300,000" deaths. Further variation within the statistics is seen through a New York Times' article, "Pestilence and famine in Brazil," which avows "150,000 persons died" from malnutrition, a consequence of the drought.

Though the inconsistency between sources may be disconcerting, the variability is understandable and explainable when studying the Grande Seca as a national epidemic rather than a drought. An indication of a national disaster is apparent as the 1877–1878 El Niño event and the Great Drought also marked the reappearance of smallpox. In 1878, the midst of the drought, smallpox resurfaced in Ceará, where the thousands of desperate emigrants wedged in refugee camps posed a prime environment for the transmission of disease. With an estimated 95% of Fortaleza's population lacking vaccination, over the next three months over 15,000 lives were claimed by smallpox. Though smallpox was prevalent throughout Brazil prior to the Grande Seca, it is difficult to ascertain whether the disease would have reappeared so ferociously without the prone to disease, malnourished, condensed population of Ceará.

Another cause of discrepancy may be related to Ceará's faulty census in the 19th century, which often omitted the majority of children born pardo because their fathers were unknown, (which is suggestive of masters impregnating their slaves). These unaccounted children skew the population statistics and therefore, the death toll as well. Additionally, since these children were born pardo, it can be assumed if they reached adulthood, they did not hold high socioeconomic status, signifying a higher susceptibility to the disastrous effects of the drought. Furthermore, the children of the unaccounted pardo population were also disadvantaged; with a higher susceptibility to disease, the president of Ceará remarked the "sad truth" of the disproportionate death rate of malnourished children.

Another misconstruction is apparent through analyzation of the emigration statistics. Although the vast majority of the population, "an estimated 90 percent," emigrated Ceará during the drought, it is debatable how many citizens survived their journey. Smith's observations of the refugees illustrate their dire means of travel:

Overall the roads there came streams of fugitives, men and women and little children, naked, lean, famine-weak, dragging wearily across the plains... They were famished... the children lagged behind in weakness, calling vainly to their panic-wild fathers; then men and women sank and died on the stones.

By August 1881, nearly two years post-drought, "50 percent of [refugees] had not returned" home. It may never be possible to verify the survival rate of these displaced citizens.

== Leishmaniasis braziliensis ==
Leishmania braziliensis is a species of leishmania or leishmaniasis that has emerged in Northeast Brazil. It is an infectious disease that is spread by a parasite in sandflies that use domestic dogs as hosts. The emergence of leishmaniasis in Brazil, specifically the Northeast state of Ceará, is theorized to date back to the Great Drought of the 19th century Brazil. The Grande Seca of 1877 to 1878 led to the mass migration of approximately 55,000 Brazilians from Ceará to the Amazon for employment on rubber plantations. The disease is easily and mostly transmitted on plantations in which the people live and work.

Direct and primary evidence of Leishmaniasis' existence is extremely minimal, as the disease was not known to the Northeast and therefore was not identified and labeled until 1895 in Bahia. Even though there was a lack of evidence associated with that name, there are still reports of a disease that matches the descriptions of Leishmania braziliensis. In 1827, before the Great Drought, Rabello cites reports from missionaries in the Amazon region seeing people with skin lesions that fit the description of the disease. In 1909, the newly graduated medical student at the time of the drought, Studart, reported a skin condition that has the potential of being Leishmaniasis. It is also possible that, in combination with a lack of general information and knowledge of the disease to the public plus the mass deaths and burials that occurred from 1877 to 1879, people were dying of Leishmaniasis without knowing the true cause of their death.

On December 10 of 1879, Studart reported seeing more than a thousand people having died in one day. It is very possible that a portion of those could have died because of Leishmaniasis. An unknown disease is also mentioned by Herbert Huntington Smith in which he accounts for the causes of deaths for 430 thousand people out of half a million who died and credit the cause of death for the remaining 70 thousand to, "various diseases". Because not many primary sources were preserved, as stated candidly by drought writer João Eudes da Costa, it is very difficult to find sources during this time that directly point to the presence of Leishmaniasis during the Great Drought. Regardless, there is evidence of the disease before and after the drought, so it is highly likely that it was present and exacerbated during the Grande Seca. After contracting and spreading the disease within the plantation, workers then left the Amazon and returned to the Northeast carrying the parasite and introducing the first cases of Leishmania braziliensis to the state.

== Aftermath ==
The Grande Seca not only destroyed the lives and livelihood of Ceará's inhabitants, but the drought dried the economy as well; once a cattle-ranching, agricultural region of Brazil, the Northeast's productions and development were destroyed without precipitation. Various industries and institutions capitalized on the impedimented state of drought survivors, leading this systematic exploitation and manipulation to be coined as the "drought industry", an industry that subsequently profited from "lucrative imperial grants." This issue was most prominent in "agricultural colonies", a government work-relief system which aspired to create "self-supporting" drought migrants. In reality, "fraud on the part of public officials", who were often collaborating with private contractors, caused the scheme to fail. It was not rare for a colony director to embellish the settlement's population while embezzling supplies necessary to sustain the colony, further incapacitating the sertanejos.

After the downfall of "relief schemes", the starving sertanejos fled in desperation to the worker-hungry hands of the rubber barons. In the hot, disease infested Amazon, the emigrants held up the "Amazon elite" and transformed what "would have never been an industry" into an extremely profitable one. According to the Economic History Association, "Brazil sold almost ninety percent of the total rubber commercialized in the world" during the decades following the Great Drought. Though some of this success may be credited to the natural abundance of Hevea trees, the tapping costs became substantially lower as thousands of wretched Cearenses entered the labor force.

Though a select few—public officials and rubber barons—profited greatly from the manipulation of cheap labor, the starvation stricken survivors' fortune continued to worsen. An article posted by the Center for Disease Control speculates that the appearance, and eventual spread, of L. braziliensis is credited to immigrants returning from rubber plantations. Though the introduction of the disease was over a century ago, L. braziliensis remains salient: nine Brazilian states report upwards of 1,000 cases per year, with the majority occurring in Ceará. Additionally, the concurrence of a Leishmaniasis infection with HIV has proven to "shorten the incubation period and increase progression [of HIV]." This is alarming considering the continual increase of HIV in northeastern Brazil, especially in rural areas which experience steep prevalence of L. braziliensis.

Although the immediate effects of the Grande Seca were detrimental, the country's dismal state persists with the drought's fallout. The Northeast remains an impoverished area, with "77% of the rural population" remaining in moderate poverty and "51% of the rural population in extreme poverty," despite general per capita income increases. As a whole, the state of Ceará has one of the lowest GDP per capita compared to other Brazilian states, an average of "R$10,473." Considering that "approximately 50% of farmers in Ceará are landless," with many owning "parcels too small to form a viable production unit," these statistics are inevitable. This causes the continuation of victimization of the low-income sertanejos by the government. Many politicians entice Northeasterners through "political clientelism", which fails "to affirm and aid people", but instead "objectifies" sertanejos.

== Analysis of the government's role ==
=== Contemporary ===
Over a century after the end of the Great Drought, the government's role in the rehabilitation of the people and area still holds importance. It is vital we analyze the policies put forth because "society's approach to drought management is instructive for how it might manage climate change", a predominant issue for the 21st-century global community. The first dam—and attempt at implementing a solution to water shortages—was completed in 1906 and was followed by the creation of what is now known as the Departamento Nacional de Obras Contra as Secas (DNOCS) in 1909. The establishment of Federal Inspectorate of Works Against Drought (IFOCS), currently became the National Department of Works Against Drought (DNOCS), aims at providing a technological approach in the water supply infrastructures. In their effort, 275 large dams were constructed between 1909 and 1983. For the duration of the 20th-century, DNOCS primary objective was to "increase water storage infrastructure", which most commonly meant the construction of reservoirs. Beyond the use of reservoirs—which rarely maintain necessary water storage—a wide array of initiatives have been contrived to minimize the impacts of droughts: "resettlement in the Amazon… integrated rural development programs, credit, education, and health care and promoted non-agricultural income." Though these modern attempts are noteworthy, "the responses are mainly reactive, [and] short-term", causing Ceará to lack "pilot actions with a long-term view." Although there are currently "public efforts to seek a long-term solution to drought", the afflicted areas still experience environmental issues—lack of agriculture and water shortages—as well as "clientelism" and "widespread corruption and political manipulation."

=== Historical ===
During the 1870s, the Brazilian government's finances were in a "ruinous state." With a large budget deficit and defaulting Cabinet, much debate was required to allocate the funds for drought relief in Ceará. Although the Ministry of Empire and the Ministry of Agriculture had each employed 26.9% of its expenditure in drought relief by 1879, the money was not well employed and relief projects failed as the government and the private sector committed fraud and exploitation, respectively. Also, when it comes to the formulation of public policies, the provinces in the northeast did not have enough political voice in the National Legislative Assembly, as their seats in the senate were constrained by their small population in comparison to the other southeastern states.

The lack of infrastructure was an obstacle for both the retirantes to escape the drought and the relief to reach the victims, revealing government's abandonment not only during the drought but also before it. The drought was also used as a means to establish lucrative deals in which government benefit their allies or other members of the elite. For example, the president of a national steamship company and a leading commercial association has invested in charity, consequently enhanced his status, as highly government and commercial associations in Rio de Janeiro had strong ties.

== See also ==
- Drought
- Agreste
- Sertão
- Caatinga
