= Tonga Meteorological Service =

The Tonga Meteorological Service is the national meteorological service of Tonga.

== History ==
The Tonga Meteorological Service was established in Marconi House in Nuku’alofa in 1919, primarily as a telegraph office to relay morse code messages from ships.

In 1945, the first Tongan was sent to train as a weather observer in Suva, monitored by the Fiji Government and the New Zealand Air Force. The South Pacific Air Transport Council (SPATC) was established a year later by New Zealand, Australia, United Kingdom, France and other Oceanic islands, many islands of the Pacific which enabled new weather stations to be built across the Pacific, including Tonga. In 1948, the first educated weather operator in Tongo set up the Fuaamotu Airport Weather Station, but closed down three years later, so in October 1951, two more officers were recruited to form the Nuku’alofa weather office.

It became the Tonga Meteorological Service when the Tongan government took over its control in 1970, although New Zealand was active until 1986 in allocating funds and paying the wages of the meteorologists who worked at the centre.

The service also regularly reports on the weather through Radio Tonga, and provides local weather forecasts.
