= 1982–1983 El Niño event =

Meteorological phenomenon

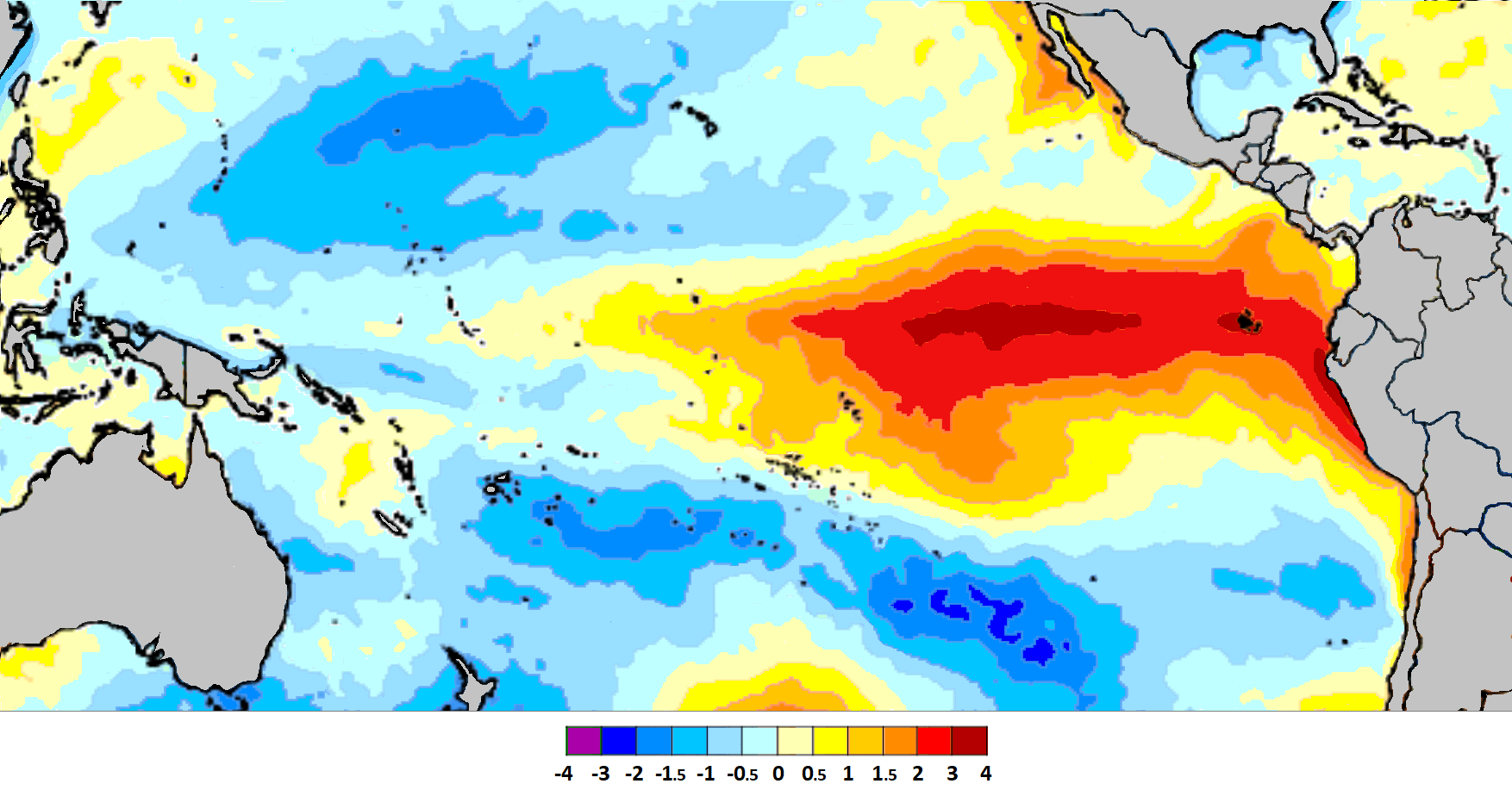
This is a map of the Pacific Ocean during the 1982–1983 winter, showing the significant warm sea surface temperature anomaly present during this event.

The 1982–1983 El Niño event was one of the strongest El Niño events since records were kept.

It led to droughts in Indonesia and Australia, widespread flooding across the southern United States, lack of snow in the northern United States, and an anomalously warm winter across much of the mid-latitude regions of North America and Eurasia. The estimated global economic impact was over US$8 billion, though more recent work has upward revised this number to be $4.1 trillion. This El Niño event also led to an abnormal number of hurricanes in the Pacific Ocean during this time span; the strongest hurricane up to 1983 hit Hawaii during the event.

== Meteorological progression ==
Due to a variety of reasons, ranging from the lack of knowledge among the general public regarding El Niño events to the fact that a volcanic eruption in Mexico from El Chichón distracted many scientists from noticing the telltale signs, this event escaped the notice of the scientific world until 1983. As pointed out by Walter Sullivan, signs began to appear in early 1982, when a noticeable and measurable drop in atmospheric pressure was noted in the central and southeastern Pacific compared to pressures found off the coast of Darwin, Australia. As the year progressed, more and more signs pointed towards an upcoming powerful El Niño event; from the collapse and subsequent reversal of the trade easterlies that traditionally prevent upwelling from occurring in the Western Pacific to the various atmospheric signatures that can all be associated with the El Niño-Southern Oscillation, these indicators all pointed to the fact that one of the most powerful El Niño events of the 20th century had begun.

== Effects on tropical cyclone development ==
As a result of the event, the 1982 Atlantic hurricane season and 1983 Atlantic hurricane season both saw a reduced number of storms and a decrease in their average strength. Over this two-year period, the most notable storm that formed over this period was Hurricane Alicia, a minimal Category 3 storm that made landfall in Texas, causing US$3 billion dollars' worth in damages. The rest of the storms that formed during these two seasons were relatively unremarkable; over the two seasons, there were only 10 named storms, 5 hurricanes, and two major hurricanes. One can expect to equal or even beat these numbers in a single season, as the tropical Atlantic typically churns out 10 named storms, 5 to 6 hurricanes, and 2 to 3 major hurricanes in a single year. (1982's Hurricane Debby reached Category 4 strength, but never made landfall).

In contrast, the 1982 Pacific hurricane season and the 1983 Pacific hurricane season were both unusually active. The 1982 season ranks as the 4th-most active season alongside 2018, while the 1983 season was the longest Pacific hurricane season recorded at the time (it was later surpassed by the 2015 and 2016 seasons). Notable storms include the aforementioned Hurricane Iwa, Hurricane Paul, and Hurricane Tico.

Despite expectations of diminished tropical cyclone activity, the western Pacific typhoon seasons of 1982 and 1983 were hardly affected by the ongoing El Niño event.

== Impacts ==
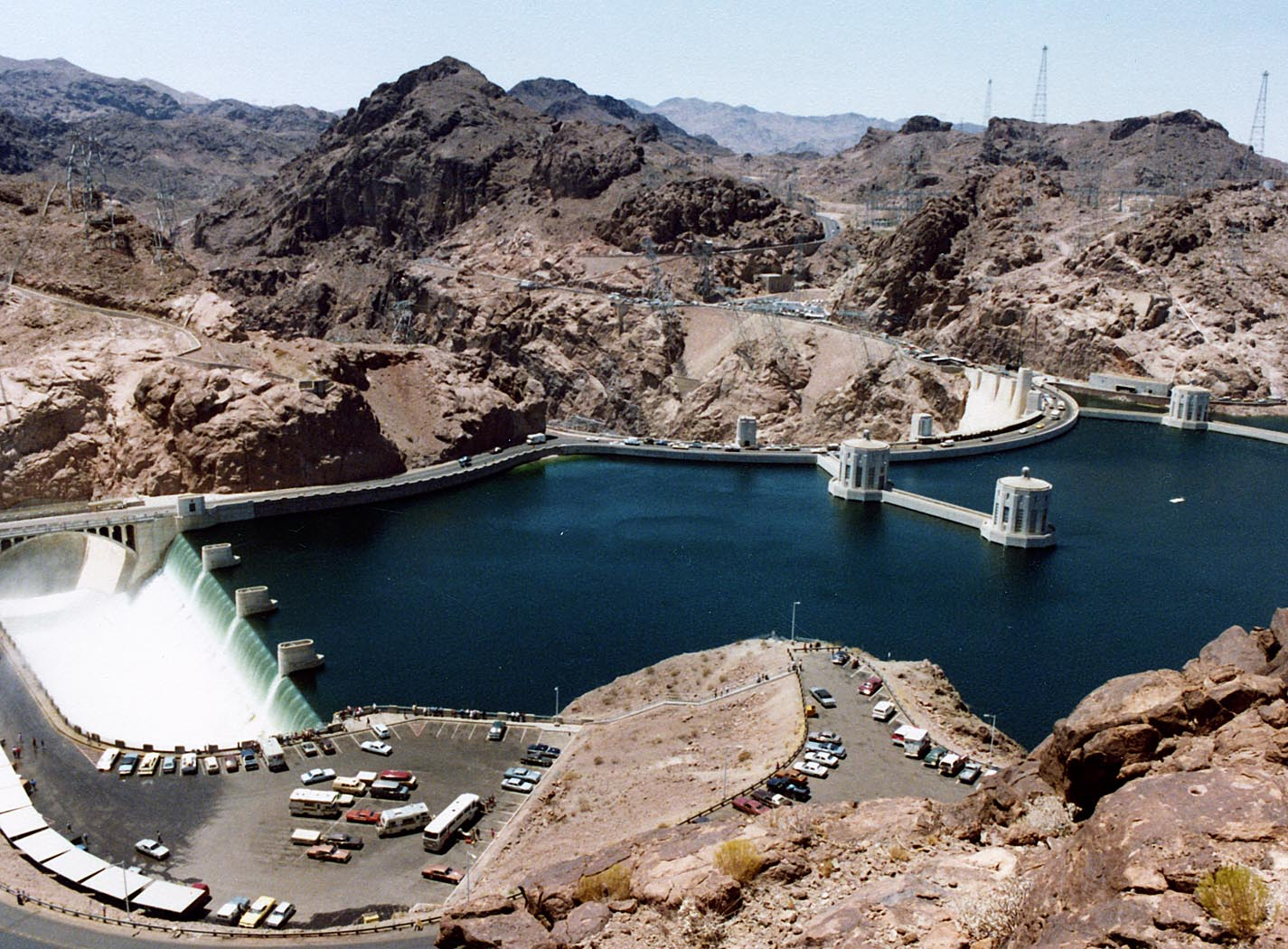
The snow and rainstorms brought by the 1982–83 El Niño event overflowed Lake Powell and Lake Mead.

The 1982–83 El Niño event changed the normal location of cold and warm waters around the Galápagos Islands, killing many of the macroalgae at the base of the food chain and increasing predation on the survivors by starving animals. One endemic species of cold water algae, Desmarestia tropica, is often held as being driven to extinction by this crisis, having not been observed by researchers since 1972. Two animal species, the Galápagos damselfish (which was considered "rare" before the event) and the 24-rayed sunstar, have not been seen since this El Niño event. Up in the food chain, the crisis led to declines of 77% among Galápagos penguins, 49% among flightless cormorants, and 25% among adult Peruvian sea lions and fur seals, plus the loss of the entire pup population in the latter two.

In Ecuador, heavy rainfall and flooding led to high fish and shrimp harvests; however, the large amounts of standing water also allowed mosquito populations to thrive, leading to large outbreaks of malaria. In just this country alone, the economic impact from this event in regards to damages caused by this flooding were estimated at over US$400 million.

Warm water to the south of the Hawaiian Islands around November allowed a late tropical disturbance to develop into Hurricane Iwa, which became the sixth wettest tropical cyclone ever recorded in Hawaii, and the costliest up to that point, causing damage totaling $312 million (1982 USD, $1.04 billion 2025 USD) and leaving 500 Hawaiians homeless. The last female Kauaʻi ʻōʻō bird was lost in the storm; her mate was recorded singing in solitary until he went silent and presumably died in 1987, marking the extinction of their species.

In Indonesia and Australia, one of the worst droughts ever occurred as a result of this event. The cooler waters led to the formation of less convection in the region, and less rainfall as a result. The damages from crop failure and loss of livestock easily surpassed US$100 million.

North America and Eurasia also faced unusually warm temperatures as a result of this event. The eastern United States in particular saw the warmest winter in roughly 25 years. Other side-effects, such as an uptick in mosquitoes, a loss in salmon off the coast of Alaska and Canada, and an increase in shark attacks off the western United States coast can all also be at least partially blamed upon this event. Several temperature records across both landmasses were broken as a result. In addition, tornado activity significantly increased across the Florida peninsula and even reached as far south as Cuba.
