= 1997–1998 El Niño event =

Meteorological event in the Pacific Ocean

- Animation of sea surface temperature anomalies in the eastern Pacific Ocean along the equator.

Meteorological history
- Formed: May 1997
- Dissipated: June 1998

Overall effects
- Damage: $32–96 billion
- Areas affected: The Pacific Ocean and surrounding areas

The 1997–1998 El Niño was regarded as one of the most powerful El Niño events in recorded history, resulting in widespread droughts, flooding and other natural disasters across the globe. It caused an estimated 16% of the world's reef systems to die, and temporarily warmed air temperature by 1.5 °C (2.7 °F) compared to the usual increase of 0.25 °C (0.45 °F) associated with El Niño events. The costs of the event were considerable, leading to global economic losses of US$5.7 trillion within five years.

It led to a severe outbreak of Rift Valley fever after extreme rainfall in north-eastern Kenya and southern Somalia. It also led to record rainfalls in California during the water season of 1997–98, one of Indonesia's worst droughts on record, and contributed to the worst tornado outbreak in the history of the state of Florida. 1998 ultimately became the warmest year in recorded history until then.

== Meteorological progression ==
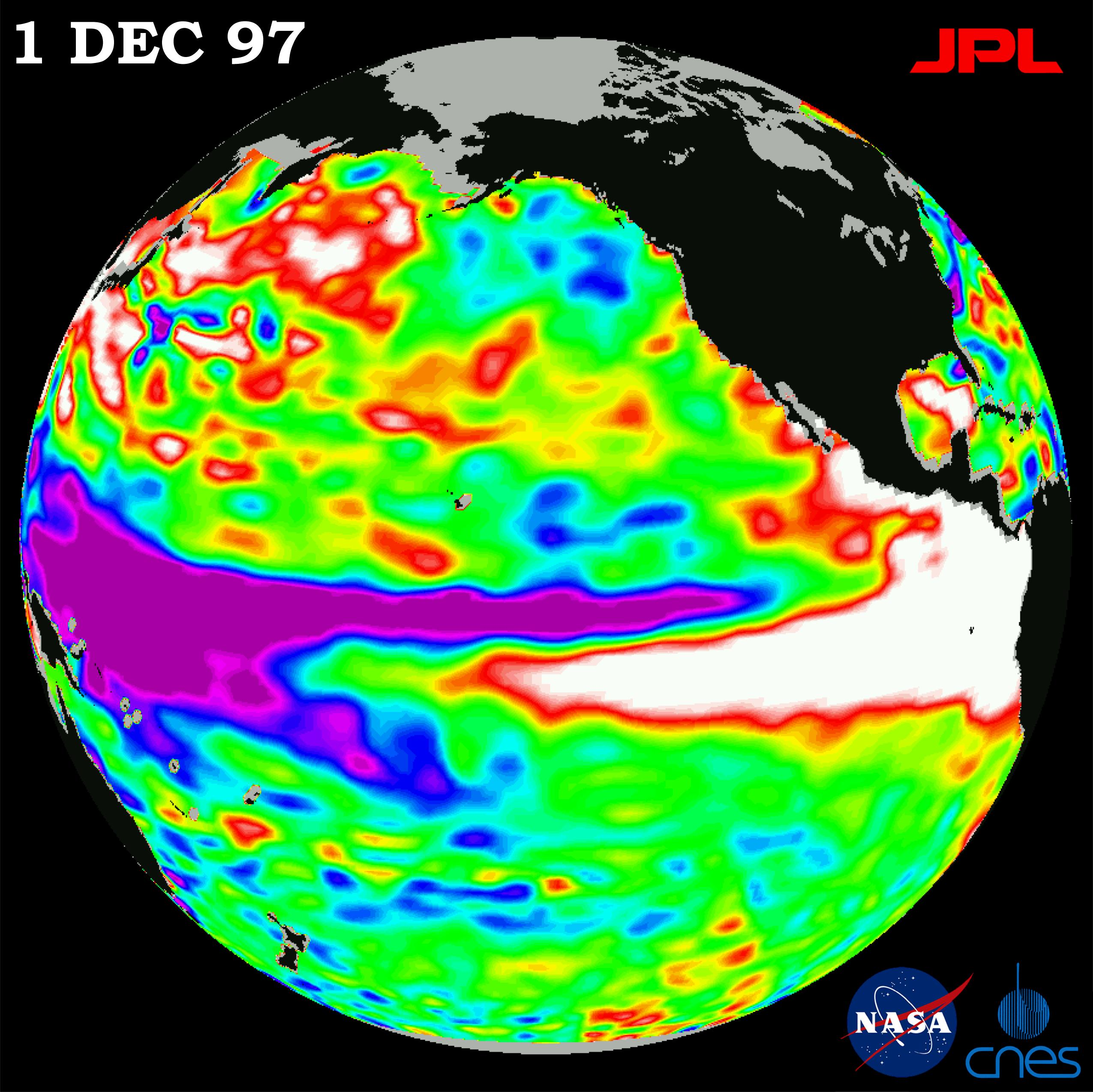
The 1997 El Niño observed by TOPEX/Poseidon. The white areas off the tropical coasts of South and North America indicate the pool of warm water

In January 1997, probes gathering information on deep water temperatures discovered an area of unusually warm water, centered around 150 meters depth, across the western half of the Pacific Ocean. About 150 m (490 ft) below the surface, water temperatures were about 3 °C (5.4 °F) above normal, signifying that an El Niño-Southern Oscillation (ENSO) event was beginning. By this time, the Scripps Institution of Oceanography had forecast that an ENSO was likely to take place during the latter half of 1997. Throughout February, water temperatures began increasing over much of the Pacific as well as in shallower waters off the coast of Peru. The above-average water temperatures covered an area roughly 11,000 km (6,800 mi) across, almost stretching from New Guinea to South America. By April, the ENSO became fully established; a column of warm water extended to the surface in the middle of the Pacific Ocean and water anomalies exceeded 5 °C (9.0 °F) about 150 m (490 ft) below the ocean surface. At the surface off the coast of Peru, water temperatures averaged 3 °C (5.4 °F) above normal.

Exceedingly warm waters became apparent by May, especially off the coast of South America where anomalies were reaching 7 °C (13 °F) above normal. Further north, sea surface temperatures along the Pacific coast of North America were increasing, with a large pool of water being 3 °C (5.4 °F) above normal. By September 1997, the ENSO became very powerful, with surface temperatures between South America and the International Dateline averaging 2–4 °C (3.6–7.2 °F) above normal, roughly a quarter of the planet's circumference. Additionally, the band of warmth along the Pacific coast of North America continued to expand, now stretching from Alaska to southern Mexico. A contrasting area of abnormally cool waters took shape near the coast of Australia by September as well, with waters 150 m (490 ft) below the surface averaging 4 °C (7.2 °F) below normal. Along the Pacific coast of the Americas, the volume of 21 to 30 °C (70 to 86 °F) water was roughly 30 times greater than that of all the water in the Great Lakes combined. The extra heat energy created by this anomaly was also about 93 times more than the energy produced by fossil fuels in the United States during 1995.

By January 1998, sea surface temperatures off the coast of Peru continued to increase, reaching 11 °C (20 °F) above average. However, the region of cooler than average water in the western Pacific expanded, signifying that a La Niña would take shape in the latter part of 1998. Just two months later, the extent of above-average water temperatures sharply decreased as the El Niño weakened. The 1997–98 ENSO event finally ended during May 1998 as below-average water temperatures extended across much of the Pacific.

== Effects on tropical cyclone activity ==
The 1997–98 El Niño Event had various effects on tropical cyclone activity around the world, with more tropical cyclones than average occurring in the Pacific basins. This included the Southern Pacific basin between 160°E and 120°W, where 16 tropical cyclones in the South Pacific were observed during the 1997–98 season compared to an average of around 8. The area where most of the tropical cyclones developed was shifted eastwards, with parts of the Cook Islands and French Polynesia impacted as a result. In the West Pacific basin, the season saw a record of 11 super typhoons, with 10 of them reaching Category 5 intensity. In the east Pacific basin, the 1997 season featured two Category 5 hurricanes, Guillermo and Linda, the latter of which was the strongest on record before Patricia took that title during the 2015 season. The North Pacific basin broke the record for having the most tropical cyclones reaching Category 4 and 5 intensities with 17 that season. However, the 2015 season surpassed it with 25 tropical cyclones during the 2014–16 El Niño event.

== See also ==
- Super El Niño events
- 1997 Pacific typhoon season
- 1997 Pacific hurricane season
- 1997 Atlantic hurricane season
- 1997–98 South-West Indian Ocean cyclone season
- 1997–98 Australian region cyclone season
- 1997–98 South Pacific cyclone season
- 1997 North Indian Ocean cyclone season
- 1998 Pacific typhoon season
