= 2014–2016 El Niño event =

Warming of the eastern Pacific Ocean

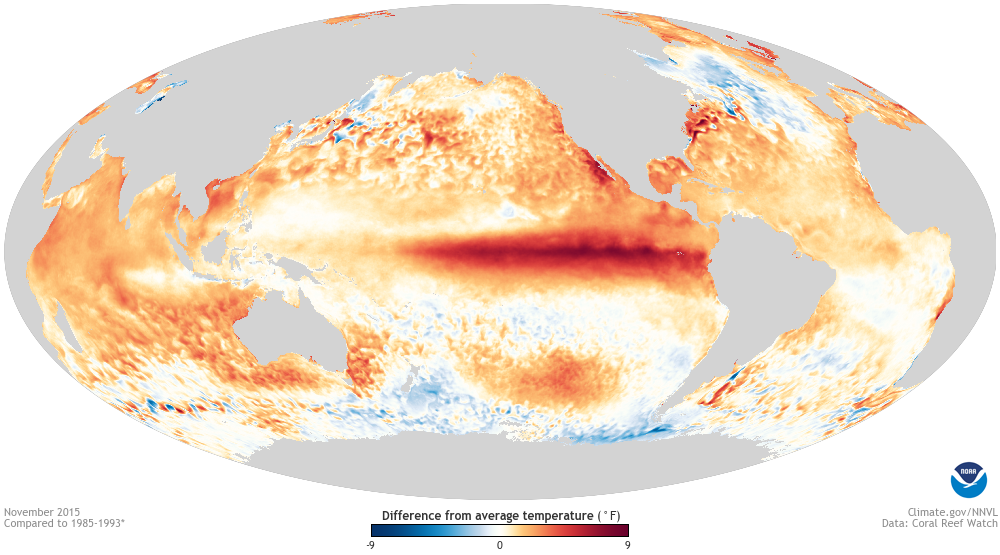
- Sea surface anomalies across the world in November 2015 during the 2014–2016 El Niño event.

Meteorological history
- Formed: October 2014 (Note: Each meteorological agency that monitors the state of the El Niño Southern Oscillation, has a different definition of what constitutes an El Niño event tailored to their needs.)
- Dissipated: May 2016

Overall effects
- Damage: Significant
- Areas affected: The Pacific Ocean and surrounding areas

The 2014–2016 El Niño was one of the strongest El Niño events on record, with unusually warm waters developing between the coast of South America and the International Date Line. These unusually warm waters influenced the world's weather in a number of ways, which in turn significantly affected various parts of the world. These included drought conditions in Venezuela, Australia and a number of Pacific islands while significant flooding was also recorded. During the event, more tropical cyclones than normal occurred within the Pacific Ocean, while fewer than normal occurred in the Atlantic Ocean.

== Meteorological progression ==
The 1997–1998 El Niño event was regarded as one of the strongest El Niño events in recorded history, which resulted in widespread drought, flooding and other natural disasters occurring around the globe. Afterwards the climate of the Pacific Ocean was dominated by a cool phase of the Pacific decadal oscillation, with three significant La Niña events occurring between 1998–2001, 2007–09 and 2010–12. Despite the La Niña background to the Pacific Climate, four El Niño events occurred during 2002–03, 2004–05, 2006–07, and 2009–10. The first three of these events were weaker, while the 2009–10 event was a strong El Niño, but had shorter effects than the 1997–98 event. After the 2010–12 La Niña event had ended, near-neutral conditions persisted over the Pacific Ocean with no La Niña or El Niño events occurring. An intense burst of typhoon activity subsequently took place between September and November 2013, which was thought to possibly be a precursor signal to an impending change of the Pacific climate towards El Niño rather than La Niña.

During January 2014, after surveying various climate models, the World Meteorological Organization warned that there was an enhanced possibility of a weak El Niño event happening during 2014. Over the next few months the climate of the Pacific Ocean started to exhibit features that suggested the impending onset of an El Niño event. Over the ocean, these features included: a rapid fall of the sea level in western Micronesia, as well as a large area of enhanced sea surface temperatures that were present at low latitudes near the International Date Line. In the atmosphere these features included persistent westerly winds at equatorial latitudes, which were displaced eastwards towards the Marshall Islands. A large area of atmospheric convection was present at a low latitude near the International Dateline, in association with the development of an unusual amount of early season tropical cyclones near the Marshall Islands. As a result of some of these conditions, an El Niño Watch was issued by the United States Climate Prediction Center (NOAA's CPC) and the International Research Institute for Climate and Society within their March 2014 diagnostic discussion. (Note: An El Nino watch is issued by the Climate Prediction Center when conditions are favourable for the development of an El Niño within the next six months.)

Over the next few months, the atmosphere failed to respond in order to reinforce the developing El Niño, with the monsoon trough remaining weak and tropical cyclone activity slowing, while no episodes of strong westerly winds at a low latitude occurred. Some of the oceanic indicators of El Niño also failed to develop further, with a cooling of sea and sub surface temperatures over the tropical Pacific occurring. However, by the end of 2014, several of the El Niño indexes that were used to judge the state of the ENSO state, indicated that weak El Nino conditions had developed over the Pacific Ocean. As a result, a few of the international meteorological agencies, including the Japan Meteorological Agency and the Hong Kong Observatory reported that an El Niño event had developed during 2014, while others such as the Fiji Meteorological Service considered 2014 to be a near miss. At this time it was thought that the ENSO state would continue to hover at the borderline El Nino conditions, before easing back into neutral ENSO conditions.

After Typhoon Higos developed during February 2015, a new forecast scenario opened: El Niño might strengthen and persist through 2015. This scenario was supported by the same climate features that had predicted the weak El Niño developing during 2014. During their March 2015 diagnostic discussion, NOAA's CPC and the IRI reported that El Niño conditions had been observed during February 2015, after the above average sea surface temperatures had become weakly coupled with the tropical atmosphere.

By January 2015, westerly wind burst activity picked up again. The first Kelvin wave developed around March and another formed around May. In addition, another strong westerly wind burst event took place around July as a result of twin tropical cyclones straddling the equator. An even stronger event in October, and an unusually stronger event during late December 2015 into January 2016, also resulted from twin cyclones on opposite sides of the equator. In May 2015, the Australian Bureau of Meteorology respectively confirmed the arrival of weak El Niño conditions. El Niño conditions were forecast in July to intensify into strong conditions by fall and winter of 2015. In addition to the warmer than normal waters generated by the El Niño conditions, the Pacific Decadal Oscillation was also creating persistently higher than normal sea surface temperatures in the northeastern Pacific. In August, the NOAA CPC predicted that the 2015 El Niño "could be among the strongest in the historical record dating back to 1950." In mid November, NOAA reported that the temperature anomaly in the Niño 3.4 region for the 3-month average from August to October 2015 was the second warmest on record with only 1997 warmer.

During November and December 2015, values within NOAA's Oceanic Niño Index peaked at 2.4 °C (4.3 °F), which surpassed December 1997 value of 2.2 °C (4.0 °F). NOAA subsequently reported that the 3-month average from November 2015 to January 2016 of the ONI had peaked at 2.3 °C (4.1 °F), which meant that the 2014–16 event was tied with the 1997–98 event for the strongest values on record. However, overall the event was considered to be one of the three strongest El Nino events since 1950, since there was a number of different ways to measure the strength of an event. The event subsequently started to weaken with sea surface temperature anomalies across the equatorial pacific decreasing, while predictions about a possible La Niña event taking place during 2016 started to be made. During May 2016, the El Niño event dissipated as near to below average sea surface temperatures, expanded across the eastern equatorial Pacific Ocean. Atmospheric anomalies over the tropical Pacific Ocean had also weakened and become consistent with ENSO neutral conditions. These anomalies included the traditional and equatorial Southern Oscillation indices becoming near zero, while atmospheric convection, upper and lower level winds all became near average. As a result of this the BoM, NOAA's CPC, IRI, and the JMA, all declared that the record-tying El Niño event had ended in late May/early June.

== Effects on tropical cyclone activity ==
The 2014–16 El Niño event influenced tropical cyclone activity around the world, where it contributed to record breaking seasons in the Central Pacific and Eastern Pacific tropical cyclone basins. By contrast, it limited Atlantic hurricane activity, producing strong vertical wind shear, increased atmospheric stability, stronger sinking motion and drier air across the tropical Atlantic. The Central Pacific basin saw its most active tropical cyclone season on record with 16 tropical cyclones recorded during 2015. Within the Southern Hemisphere, the El Niño pushed tropical cyclone activity in the South Pacific Ocean eastwards, with activity flourishing near Vanuatu, Fiji and Tonga. As a result of this displacement and other factors such as a positive Indian Ocean Dipole, the 2015–16 Australian region cyclone season was the least active since reliable records started during 1950s, with only three named tropical cyclones developing in the region compared to an average of eleven.

The event also contributed to six systems forming outside of the season boundaries, within the North Atlantic, Eastern and Southern Pacific basins. These systems included Tropical Cyclone Raquel, which was considered by some to be a part of both the 2014–15 and 2015–16 seasons, but was later deemed to only be a part of the 2014–15 season. Tropical Depressions 01F and 02F developed in the South Pacific during July and October 2015, which affected Fiji, Vanuatu and the Solomon Islands. Tropical Depression Nine-C subsequently formed in the Central Pacific on 31 December, whose remnants in turn contributed to the development of Hurricane Pali on 7 January. This also caused the latest end and earliest start to the 2015 and 2016 Pacific hurricane seasons, respectively.

Other significant tropical cyclones during the event included: Cyclone Pam, which became the second most intense tropical cyclone in the South Pacific in terms of wind speed and devastated Vanuatu; Cyclone Winston, was the most intense tropical cyclone in the Southern Hemisphere and devastated Fiji; Cyclone Fantala, which was the strongest storm in terms of 1-minute and 10-minute sustained winds in the South Indian Ocean; and Hurricane Patricia, which was the second-most-intense tropical cyclone on record globally in terms of barometric pressure, and the strongest in terms of 1-minute sustained winds.

== Impact ==
The El Niño event affected millions of people around the world, including in Africa, Central America, Southeast Asia, and the Pacific Islands. These effects included below or above-average rainfall, flooding, increased food insecurity, higher malnutrition rates and devastated livelihoods. The El Niño event also contributed to the Earth's warming trend, with 2014 and 2015 being two of the warmest years on record. Over 60 million people faced hunger and malnutrition in 2016 due to drought effects influenced by ENSO, with Africa worst hit, Indochina faced a severe drop in food production, and Ethiopia counted 10 million people at risk.

=== Australia ===
Over Australia, the drying influence of the event was initially counteracted by warm temperatures in the Indian Ocean, which lead to above average rainfall falling over parts of Western Australia, New South Wales and eastern Victoria. However, by the start of austral Spring 2015, the Indian Ocean had started to help the El Niño, which resulted in Australia's third-driest spring on record and limited growth at the end of cropping season. The lack of heavy rains in the north and west meant reduced downtime for mining, while fewer clouds and less tropical rain, contributed to the most severe coral bleaching event on record for the Great Barrier Reef. The combination of heat and low rainfall brought a very early start to the 2015–16 Australian bushfire season, with over 125 fires burning in Victoria and Tasmania during October. Dry conditions in Tasmania also resulted in hundreds of fires being started by dry lightning during January 2016, which damaged large areas of the Tasmanian Wilderness World Heritage Area, including parts which may not have seen fire for centuries.

=== Africa ===
The El Niño event enhanced the 2015 short rains season between October and December 2015, with more rainfall than normal falling in eastern Africa. The 2014–2016 El-Niño phenomenon, according to the World Meteorological Organization, is one of the three strongest since 1950. A number of countries in Africa including Lesotho, Swaziland and Zimbabwe declared national states of emergency, while the Southern African Development Community declared a regional drought disaster in March 2016.

=== North America ===
During the winter of 2014–2015, the typical precipitation and impacts of an El Niño event did not occur over North America, as the event was weak and on the borderline of being an event. Both northern New York and lower Ontario in Canada received unprecedented snowfall early in the winter with Buffalo buried in 7 feet (2.1 m) and Toronto in 3 feet (0.91 m). Ahead of the 2015–16 winter, it was hoped that the El Niño would bring some relief from five years of drought conditions that had occurred in California. However, the event failed to end the long term dryness, despite some regions including Pacifica receiving heavy rain which led to mudslides. In the south eastern and south central United States above normal rainfall occurred, with Missouri receiving three times its normal rainfall during November and December 2015. El Niño also contributed to the January 2016 United States winter storm becoming the largest snowstorm on record for New York City, despite the winter clocking in as the warmest winter on record in New England, and second warmest for New York State and New Jersey.

El Niño also resulted in below average activity in the 2015 Atlantic hurricane season, which only produced 11 tropical storms and 4 hurricanes, below the averages of 12 and 6 respectively.

=== South America ===
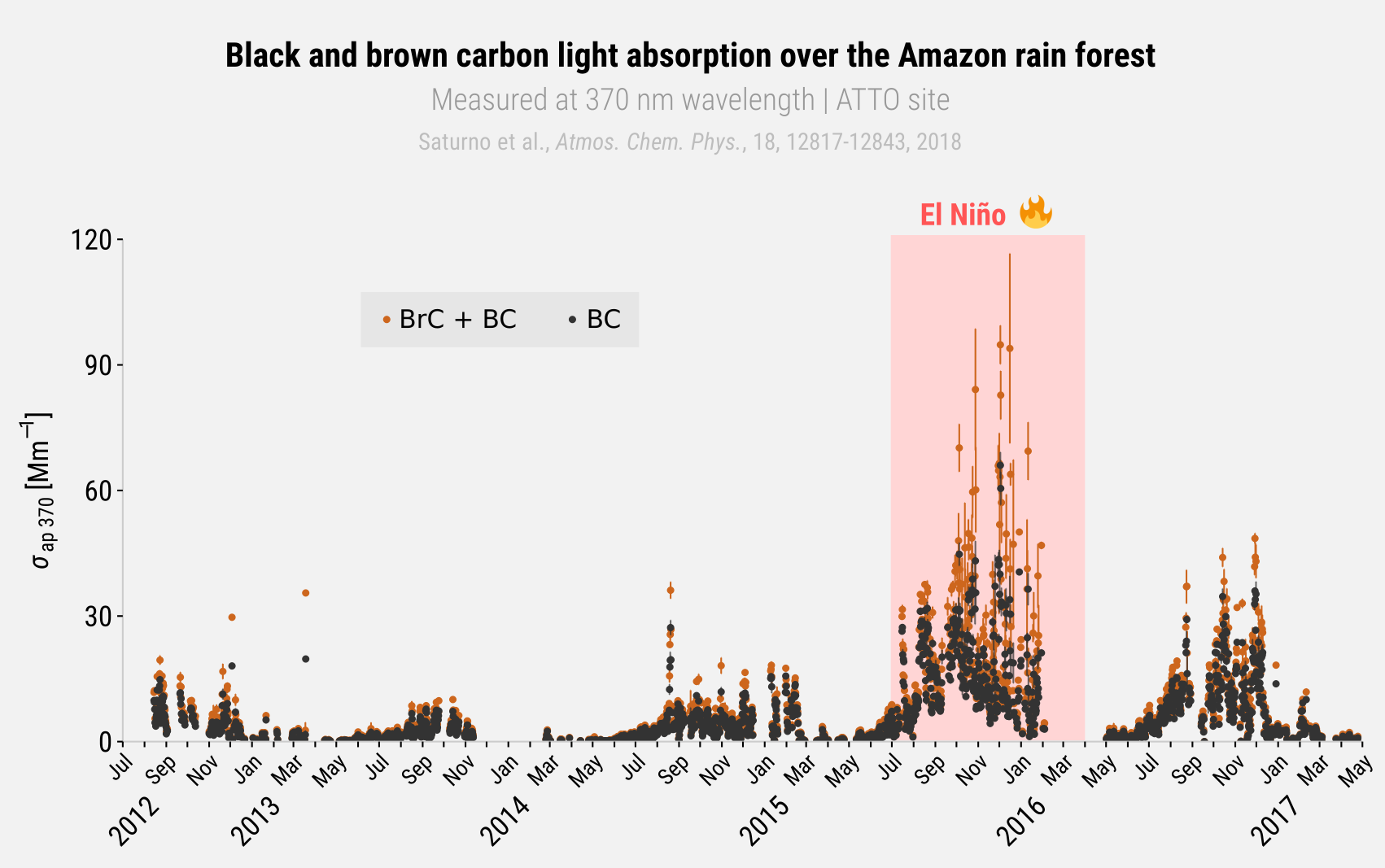
Increased black and brown carbon over the Amazon rainforest due to high fire activity.

Between September and December 2015, Northern South America was generally dry, with parts of Venezuela suffering from drought conditions. Over the same period Uruguay, southern Brazil, and Paraguay experienced a lot of rain. In 2015, the Southeast Region of Brazil suffered the consequences of a severe drought (aggravated by El Niño), which led to above-average temperatures and a large decline in the level of several rivers and reservoirs; as a result, residents had to save water and cutoffs were made. However, at the same time, the South Region passed by a large period of severe thunderstorms (another consequence of El Niño), which led to strong floods; several rivers reached the highest level in decades and thousands of people were left homeless. The increased occurrence of fires in the southern Amazon Basin produced a significant increase in aerosol pollution over the Amazon rainforest.

=== Pacific Islands ===
During the event the Walker circulation and associated rainfall was shifted eastwards, which meant that a large part of the Pacific received below average rainfall. As a result, drought conditions were observed on several Pacific island nations, with an estimated 4.7 million people affected including people in Fiji, Micronesia, Palau, Samoa, Vanuatu, Tonga, the Solomon Islands and the Marshall Islands.

During the event, tuna schools migrated away from their traditional waters near Papua New Guinea, to waters surrounding the island nation of Kiribati. As a result of this over 700,000 tonnes (690,000 long tons; 770,000 short tons) of Tuna was caught in waters surrounding Kiribati during 2014, while the island nation was able to sell access rights to international fishing firms at over $15,000 a day. Projections were subsequently made by the Asian Development Bank that Kiribati, would earn over AUD 150 million (US$109 million) during 2015 from fishing licences.

Researchers from the NOAA also recorded coral cover losses of up to 90% at study sites on the island of Kiritimati (Christmas Island) after the 2015/16 El Niño event.

As El Niño conditions started to develop during early 2014, sea levels in western Micronesia including in waters surrounding the island nations of Palau and Guam dropped by 6–9 feet (1.8–2.7 m). In Palau, the El Niño resulted in the worst drought conditions in nearly eighty years. The island nations of Palau, the Federated States of Micronesia, and the Marshall Islands made emergency or disaster declarations, due to extreme drought conditions from the El Niño.

2015 also set a record for most active hurricane season in the eastern Pacific, and contributed to the intensity of Hurricane Patricia, which wound up having the fastest wind speed of any tropical cyclone in recorded history.

=== Southeastern Asia ===
==== Philippines ====
Within the Philippines, the El Niño event caused a delay in the onset of the 2015 rainy season, while causing weaker than normal monsoon activity, below average rainfall, fewer tropical cyclones and above average air temperatures. As a result of this 85% of the provinces were hit by drought conditions, while PAGASA advised people to conserve water, in case the high water level of the Angat Dam fell below 212 metres (696 ft). During April 2016, the Philippine Department of Agriculture, estimated total damages to crops between February 2015 and March 2016, at just under PhP 10 billion (US$217 million).

In Maguindanao, many rice and corn fields were destroyed by the drought brought by El Niño, and soon, the provincial government declared a state of calamity in the province. Earlier, Cotabato declared a state of calamity, and the provincial government's aid to the farmers suffering from the drought caused a protest and a clash with police in Kidapawan.

Iloilo, Guimaras, General Santos, Isabela, Quirino, Bukidnon, Davao del Sur, Basilan, Bohol, and Cebu declared a state of calamity due to Typhoon Melor.

==== Vietnam ====
Cửu Long Droughts and saltwater infiltration were considered to be particularly serious, the worst within the last 100 years, causing severe damage to the western provinces.

=== United Kingdom ===
The winter of 2015–2016 brought serious floods, record rainfall and very mild temperatures across the UK. The Central England Temperature is a series of temperature data going back to 1659, the winter of 2015–2016 ranked as second warmest, behind 1868–1869. The England and Wales Precipitation records go back to 1766, and 2015–16 was the ninth wettest winter on record. It is thought that this was caused by the strong El Niño.

== See also ==
- Super El Niño events
