= Potential predictability =

The term potential predictability is used in the context of weather forecasting to describe the extent that the future weather can be predicted in principle, i.e., it describes the proportion of variance in the weather that arises from systematic factors rather than random noise.

== Mathematical formalization ==
Denote by $\sigma$ the standard deviation in weather outcomes, so that $\sigma^2$ is the variance in weather outcomes. Of this, denote by $\sigma_\nu^2$ the internally generated variance component and by $\sigma_\varepsilon^2$ the unpredictable noise component. We have:

$\sigma^2 = \sigma_\nu^2 + \sigma_\varepsilon^2$

The potential predictability variance fraction (ppvf) is defined as:

$p = \frac{\sigma_\nu^2}{\sigma^2} = \frac{\sigma_\nu^2}{\sigma_\nu^2 + \sigma_\varepsilon^2}$

The signal-to-noise ratio is defined as:

$\gamma = \frac{\sigma_\nu^2}{\sigma_\varepsilon^2}$

$p$ and $\gamma$ can be computed from each other:

$p = \frac{\gamma}{1 + \gamma}\qquad ,\qquad \gamma = \frac{p}{1 - p}$

We have $0 < p < 1$. Small values of $p$ indicate that the signal is small, and that the weather is inherently unpredictable. Values of $p$ close to 1 suggest that the weather is potentially predictable, even if current weather prediction methods do not predict it successfully.

== Research ==
Potential predictabilities have been estimated for different aspects of the weather and climate system, including heat transport, the Madden–Julian oscillation, and precipitation.
