= Paul Julian =

Paul Julian may refer to:

- Paul Julian (artist) (1914–1995), American artist and designer
- Paul Julian (meteorologist) (born 1929), American meteorologist
