= Maritime Southeast Asia =

Cultural and economic area within Southeast Asia

- The biogeographical region of Malesia corresponds to Maritime Southeast Asia

Geography
- Location: Indonesian Archipelago; Philippine Archipelago; Peninsular Malaysia; East Malaysia; Brunei; Singapore; Timor-Leste
- Total islands: 25,000
- Major islands: Borneo, Java, Luzon, Mindanao, Sulawesi, Sumatra
- Area: 2,870,000 km^{2} (1,110,000 sq mi)
- Highest elevation: 4,095 m (13435 ft)
- Highest point: Mount Kinabalu
- Brunei
- Largest settlement: Bandar Seri Begawan
- Indonesia
- Largest settlement: Jakarta
- Malaysia
- Largest settlement: Kuala Lumpur
- Philippines
- Largest settlement: Quezon City
- Singapore
- Largest settlement: Singapore
- Timor-Leste
- Largest settlement: Dili

Demographics
- Demonym: Southeast Asian, Maritime Southeast Asian
- Population: 380 million
- Ethnic groups: Predominantly Austronesians, with minorities of Negritoes, Papuans, Melanesians, descendants of Chinese (including Peranakans), Arab descendants, Eurasians, Mestizos, Orang Asli and descendants of Overseas Indians and Sri Lankans

Maritime Southeast Asia comprises the Southeast Asian countries of Brunei, Indonesia, Malaysia, the Philippines, Singapore, and Timor-Leste.

The terms Island Southeast Asia and Insular Southeast Asia are sometimes given the same meaning as Maritime Southeast Asia. (Note: For instance Tom Hoogervorst's chapter in The Routledge Handbook of Archaeology and Globalization: "I use Island Southeast Asia and Maritime Southeast Asia interchangeably.") Other definitions restrict Island Southeast Asia to just the islands between Mainland Southeast Asia and the continental shelf of Australia and New Guinea. There is some variability as to whether Taiwan is included in this. Peter Bellwood includes Taiwan in his definition, (Note: Bellwood's definition: "Island Southeast Asia includes Taiwan, the Philippines, Brunei and the Sarawak and Sabah provinces of East Malaysia (northern Borneo), and all of the islands of Indonesia to the west of New Guinea.") as did Robert Blust, (Note: Robert Blust: "The major western island groups include the great Indonesian, or Malay Archipelago, to its north the smaller and more compact Philippine Archipelago, and still further north at 22 to 25 degrees north latitude and some 150 kilometres from the coast of China, the island of Taiwan (Formosa). Together these island groups constitute insular (or island) Southeast Asia.") whilst there are examples that do not. (Note: "Island Southeast Asia (ISEA) comprises the tropical islands lying in between mainland East Asia and Taiwan to the northwest and Australia and New Guinea to the southeast.")

The 16th-century term "East Indies" and the later 19th-century term "Malay Archipelago" are also used to refer to Maritime Southeast Asia.

Arab merchants and cartographers referred to Maritime Southeast Asia as Al-Jaza'ir Al-Jawi or Java archipelago. People originating from this region were commonly identified by the name 'Al-Jawi'.

In Indonesia, the Old Javanese term "Nusantara" is also used as a synonym for Maritime Southeast Asia. The term, however, is nationalistic and has shifting boundaries. It usually only encompasses Peninsular Malaysia, the Sunda Islands, Maluku, and often Western New Guinea and excludes the Philippines.

Stretching for several thousand kilometres, the area has a large number of islands and is one of the most bio-diverse places on Earth.

The main demographic difference that sets Maritime Southeast Asia apart from modern Mainland Southeast Asia is that its population predominantly belongs to Austronesian groups. The region contains some of the world's most highly urbanized areas—the Greater Manila Area, Greater Jakarta, Singapore, and Greater Kuala Lumpur—and yet a majority of islands in this vast region remain uninhabited by humans.

== Geography ==
The land and sea area of Maritime Southeast Asia exceeds 2 million km^{2}. These are more than 25,000 islands of the area that comprise many smaller archipelagoes.

The major groupings are:

- Peninsular Malaysia
- Singapore, Indonesia, Timor-Leste, East Malaysia and Brunei
  - Sunda Islands
    - Greater Sunda Islands
    - Lesser Sunda Islands
  - Maluku Islands
- Philippines
  - Visayan Islands
  - Sulu Archipelago

The seven largest islands are Borneo, Sumatra, Sulawesi and Java in Indonesia; and Luzon and Mindanao in the Philippines.

In the natural sciences, the region is sometimes known as the Maritime Continent. It also corresponds to the biogeographical region of Malesia (not to be confused with "Malaysia"), with shared tropical flora and fauna.

Geologically, the archipelago is one of the most active volcanic regions in the world, producing many volcanoes, especially in Java, Sumatra, and the Lesser Sunda Islands region, where most volcanoes over 3,000 m (9,800 ft) are situated. Tectonic uplifts also produced large mountains, including the highest in Mount Kinabalu in Sabah, Malaysia, with a height of 4,095.2 m (13,436 ft) and Puncak Jaya on Papua, Indonesia at 4,884 m (16,024 ft). Other high mountains in the archipelago include Puncak Mandala, Indonesia at 4,760 m (15,620 ft) and Puncak Trikora, Indonesia, at 4,750 m (15,580 ft).

The Philippines, Malaysia, Brunei, Northern Sumatra, Northern Borneo and Northern Maluku are in the Northern Hemisphere. Most of Indonesia and Timor-Leste are below the equator in the Southern Hemisphere.

=== Climate ===
Climate of Southeast Asia

In the Köppen climate classification, most of Maritime Southeast Asia has a tropical rainforest climate. The Philippine island Luzon has a tropical rainforest and tropical savannah climate in the center and west-coast. Indonesia's southern islands (center and east of Java, Borneo etc.) have a tropical monsoon climate. Timor-Leste has a tropical savannah climate.

== Biogeography ==
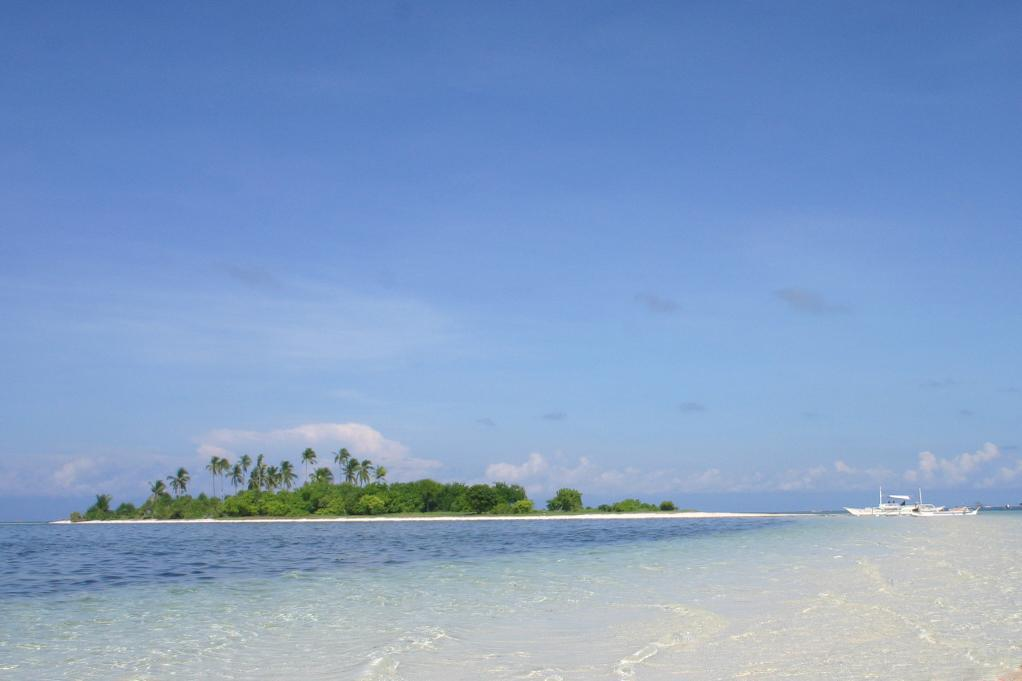
One of the majority of uninhabited islands of the Philippines. Maritime Southeast Asia is made up of the world's two largest archipelagos situated between the Indian Ocean, the South China Sea and the Western Pacific.

Island Southeast Asia is crossed by the Wallace Line. This line divides the flora and fauna of Asia from that of Australia and New Guinea with stretches of water that have always been too wide for plant and animal species to cross readily. The gaps are considered to be large enough to make accidental rafting from one side to another to be unlikely events. Apart from birds, species that have managed to cross this line include those that have been moved by humans. There is a transitional zone adjacent to the Wallace Line that is termed Wallacea. This is a zone where examples of animal and plant species from both sides can be found, but, particularly on smaller islands, there may be a greatly reduced number of terrestrial species.

The biographical division of the region is important for understanding the spread of both modern and archaic humans into the region. The Wallace Line represents a sea barrier that has persisted, as far as is known, even at the lowest sea levels of glacial maxima of the Pleistocene and the Holocene. Therefore it is known when watercraft of some (admittedly unknown) description must have been used by humans to cross the sea.

A portion of the region also forms the western half of the Coral Triangle, which is home to over half of the world's coral species.

== Culture and demographics ==
As of 2017, there were over 540 million people living in the region, with the most populated island being Java. The people living there are predominantly from Austronesian subgroupings and correspondingly speak western Malayo-Polynesian languages. This region of Southeast Asia shares social and cultural ties with both the peoples of Mainland Southeast Asia and with other Austronesian peoples in the Pacific. Islam is the predominant religion, with Christianity being the dominant religion in the Philippines and Timor-Leste. Buddhism, Hinduism, and traditional Animism are also practiced among large populations.

Historically, the region has been referred to as part of Greater India, as seen in Coedes' Indianized States of Southeast Asia, which refers to it as "Island Southeast Asia"; and within Austronesia or Oceania, due to shared ethnolinguistic and historical origins of the latter groups (Micronesian and Polynesian groups) being from this region.

== History ==
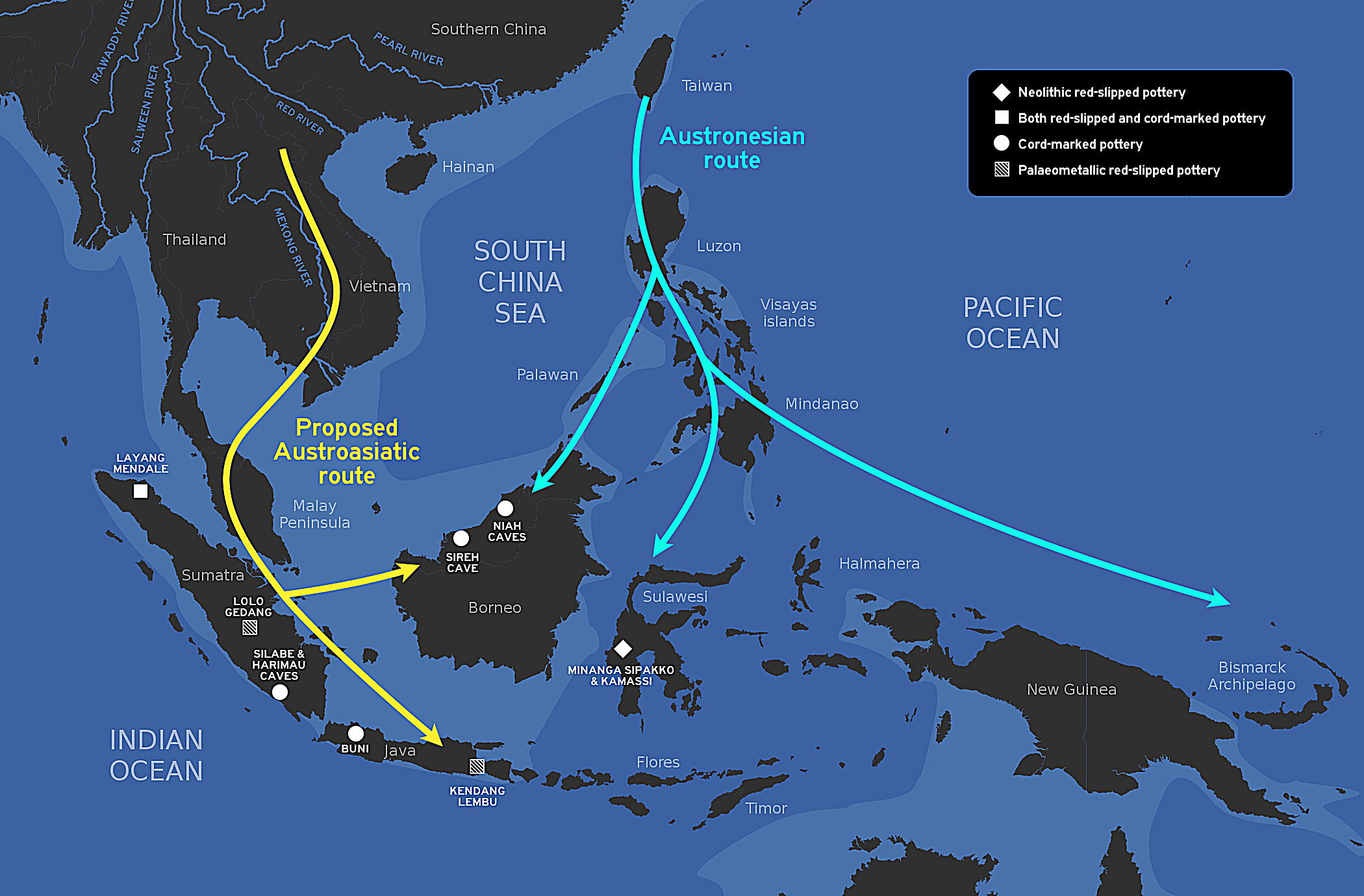
Proposed routes of Austroasiatic and Austronesian migrations into Maritime Southeast Asia

The maritime connectivity within the region has been linked to it becoming a distinct cultural and economic area, when compared to the 'mainland' societies in the rest of Southeast Asia. This region stretches from the Yangtze delta in China down to the Malay Peninsula, including the South China Sea, Gulf of Thailand and Java Sea. The region was dominated by the thalassocratic cultures of the Austronesian peoples.

=== Ancient Indian Ocean trade ===
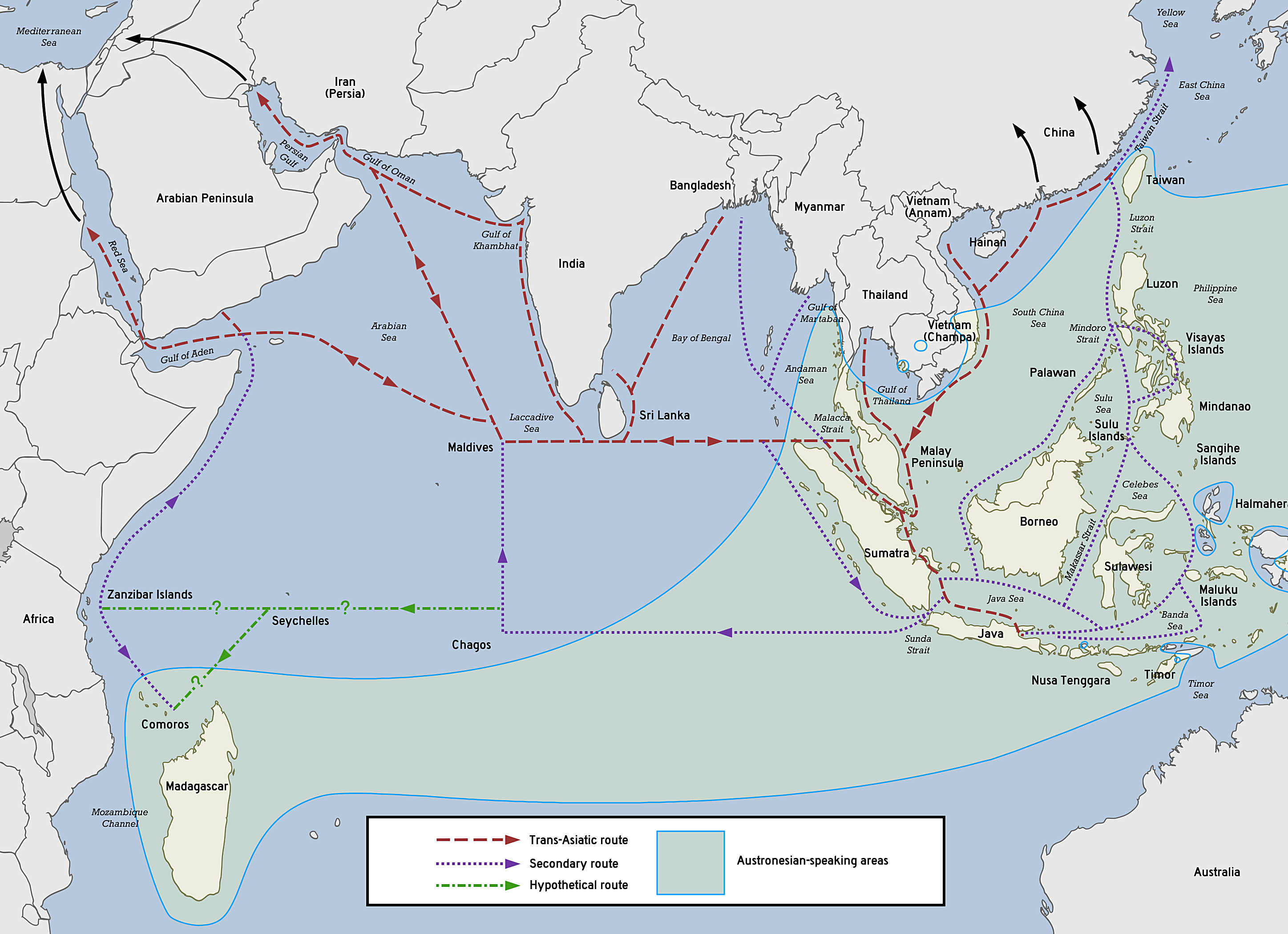
Austronesian proto-historic and historic maritime trade network in the Indian Ocean

The first true long-distance maritime trade network in the Indian Ocean was by the Austronesian peoples of Island Southeast Asia. They established trade routes with Southern India and Sri Lanka as early as 1500 BCE, ushering an exchange of material culture (like catamarans, outrigger boats, lashed-lug and sewn-plank boats, and paan) and cultigens (like coconuts, sandalwood, and sugarcane); as well as connecting the material cultures of India and China. Indonesians, in particular were trading in spices (mainly cinnamon and cassia) with East Africa using catamaran and outrigger boats and sailing with the help of the Westerlies in the Indian Ocean. This trade network expanded to reach as far as Africa and the Arabian Peninsula, resulting in the Austronesian colonization of Madagascar by the first half of the first millennium CE. It continued up to historic times.

=== Maritime Silk Road ===
By around the 2nd century BCE, the Neolithic Austronesian trade networks in Southeast Asia connected with the maritime trade routes of South Asia, the Middle East, eastern Africa, and the Mediterranean, becoming what is now known as the Maritime Silk Route (or Maritime Silk Road). In addition to Austronesian sailors, the route was also heavily used by Tamil, Persian, and Arab sailors. It allowed the exchange of goods from East and Southeast Asia on one end, all the way to Europe and eastern Africa on the other.

Although usually spoken of in modern times in the context of Eurocentric and Sinocentric luxury goods, the goods carried by the trading ships varied by which product was in demand by region and port. They included ceramics, glass, beads, gems, ivory, fragrant wood, metals (both raw and finished goods), textiles (including silk), food (including grain, wine, and spices), aromatics, and animals, among others. Ivory, in particular, was a significant export of east Africa, leading some authors to label the western leg of the trade route as the "Maritime Ivory Route".

The Maritime Silk Road flourished until around the 15th century CE. Han and Tang dynasty records mention large Southeast Asian ships (that they called the kunlun po, 崑崙舶, "ships of the kunlun") visiting coastal Chinese cities regularly to trade from as early as the 3rd century CE.

By around 900 to 1000 CE, the Song dynasty passed decrees enabling private trade fleets. Demand for Southeast Asian products and trade was partially driven by the increase in China's population in this era, whereby it doubled from 75 to 150 million, as well as the loss of access to the northern Silk Road. The first record of Chinese trading ships venturing to Southeast Asia (which they called Nan Hai) appear by the 11th century, though the trade routes during this period remained dominated by Srivijaya. The Chinese development of their own maritime technologies led to the establishment of Chinese trading colonies in Southeast Asia, a boom in the maritime trade, and the emergence of the ports of "Chinchew" (Quanzhou) and "Canton" (Guangzhou) as regional trade centers in China. Chinese trade was strictly controlled by the Imperial Court, but the Hokkien diaspora facilitated informal trade and cultural exchange with Southeast Asia, settling among Southeast Asian polities during this time period. Despite not having the official sanction of the Chinese government these communities formed business and trade networks between cities such as Melaka, Hội An and Ayutthaya. Many of these Chinese businesspeople integrated into their new countries, becoming political officials and diplomats.

Trade with China ceased after the collapse of the Song dynasty due to invasions and famine. It was restored during the Ming dynasty from the 14th to 16th centuries. The naval expeditions of Zheng He between 1405 and 1431 also played a critical role in opening up of China to increased trade with Southeast Asian polities.

The Maritime Silk Route was disrupted by the colonial era in the 15th century, essentially being replaced with European trade routes. Shipbuilding of the formerly dominant Southeast Asian trading ships (jong, the source of the English term "junk") declined until it ceased entirely by the 17th century. Although Chinese-built chuán survived until modern times. There was new demand for spices from Southeast Asia and textiles from India and China, but these were now linked with direct trade routes to the European market, instead of passing through regional ports of the Indian Ocean Maritime Silk Road.

Oceans and seas in Southeast Asia

== See also ==
- Southeast Asia
  - Mainland Southeast Asia
  - Western Southeast Asia
- Brunei Darussalam–Indonesia–Malaysia–Philippines East ASEAN Growth Area
- Philippine archipelago
- Indonesian archipelago
- Farther India
- Greater India
- Greater Indonesia
- Maritime Continent
- Malay race
- Malay world
- Malesia
- Maphilindo
- Nanyang
- Peninsular Malaysia
- Domesticated plants and animals of Austronesia
