= Ernest Hovmöller =

Ernest Hovmöller (1912–2008) was a Danish born meteorologist. He is best known for his Hovmöller diagram.

Hovmöller joined Danish Meteorological Institute (DMI) in 1937 when he was 25. He was interested in upper atmosphere aerology and worked in 1936 for 4 months in Lindenberg outside Berlin, Germany. Hovmöller joined aerological section at Swedish Meteorological and Hydrological Institute in November 1946 where he worked with, among others, Carl-Gustaf Rossby.
