= Tropical wave =

Type of atmospheric trough

Tropical Storm Dorian as a tropical wave just north of Puerto Rico on July 29, 2013.

A tropical wave (also called storm surge, easterly wave, tropical easterly wave, and African easterly wave), in and around the Atlantic Ocean, is a type of atmospheric trough, an elongated area of relatively low air pressure, oriented north to south, which moves from east to west across the tropics, causing areas of cloudiness and thunderstorms. Tropical waves are generally carried westward by the prevailing easterly winds along the tropics and subtropics near the equator. They can lead to the formation of tropical cyclones in the north Atlantic and northeastern Pacific basins. A tropical wave study is aided by Hovmöller diagrams, a graph of meteorological data.

West-moving waves can also form from the tail end of frontal zones in the subtropics and tropics, and may be referred to as easterly waves, but the waves are not properly called tropical waves. They are a form of inverted trough that shares many characteristics of a tropical wave.

== Characteristics ==
A tropical wave normally follows an area of sinking, intensely dry air, blowing from the northeast. After the passage of the trough line, the wind veers southeast, the humidity abruptly rises, and the atmosphere destabilizes. This yields widespread showers and thunderstorms, sometimes severe. As the wave moves westward, the showers gradually diminish.

An exception to the association of convection can occur in the Atlantic. Sometimes, a surge of dry air called the Saharan Air Layer (SAL) follows a tropical wave, leaving cloudless skies, as convection is capped by the dry layer inversion. Additionally, any dust in the SAL reflects sunlight, reducing solar heating of the air below it.

== Atlantic ==
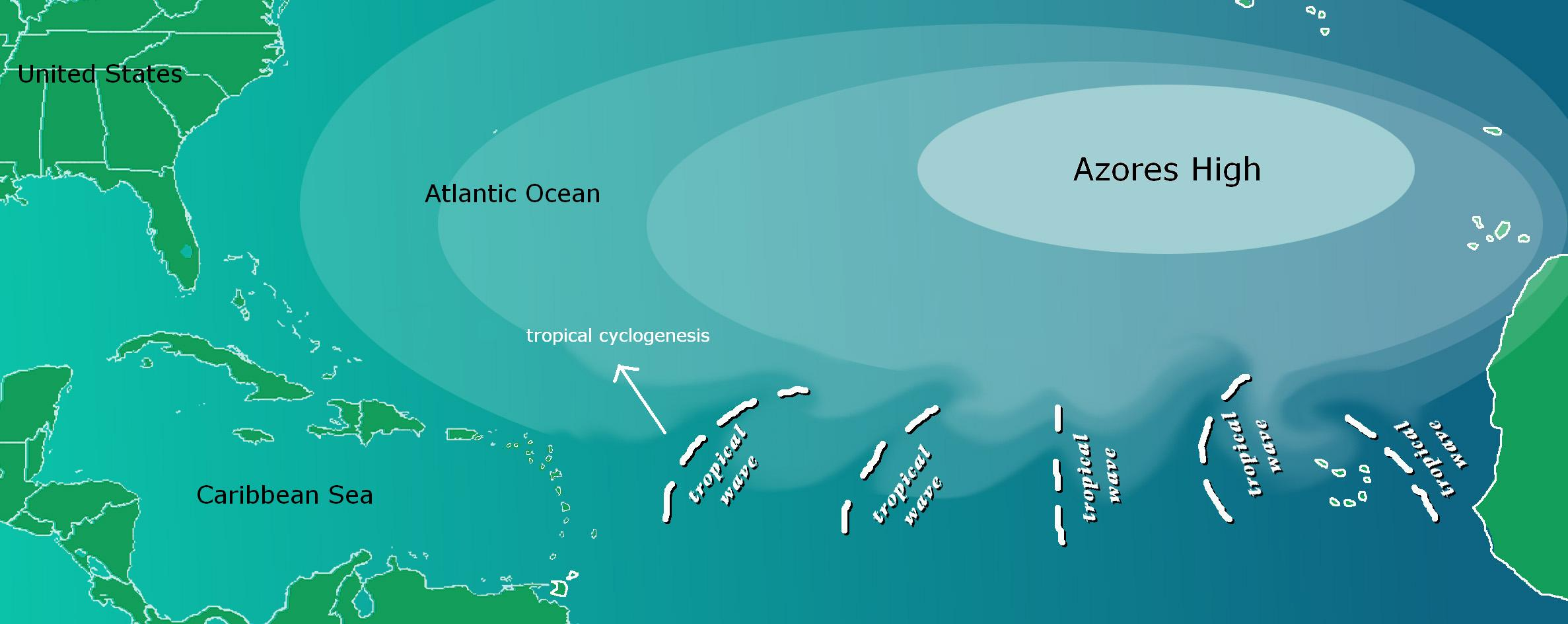
Tropical wave formation

Tropical waves in the Atlantic basin develop from low-pressure disturbances, which develop as far east as Sudan in east Africa, and drift across the continent into the Atlantic Ocean. These are generated or enhanced by the African Easterly Jet. The clockwise circulation of the large transoceanic high-pressure cell or anticyclone centered near the Azores islands (known as the Azores High) impels easterly waves away from the coastal areas of Africa towards North America.

Tropical waves are the origin of approximately 60% of Atlantic tropical cyclones and of approximately 85% of intense Atlantic hurricanes (Category 3 and greater).

Tropical cyclones can sometimes degenerate back into a tropical wave. This normally occurs if upper-level wind shear is too strong. The storm can redevelop if the upper-level shear abates.

If a tropical wave is moving quickly, or is organized enough, it can have winds of a strength in excess of tropical storm force, but it is not considered a tropical storm unless it has a closed low-level circulation. An example of this was Hurricane Claudette in 2003, where the original wave had winds of 45 mph (72 km/h) before developing a closed low-level circulation.

== East Pacific ==
It has been suggested that some eastern Pacific Ocean tropical cyclones are formed out of tropical easterly waves that originate in North Africa as well. After developing into a tropical cyclone, some of those systems can then reach the Central Pacific Ocean, such as Hurricane Lane in 2018. During the summer months, tropical waves can extend northward as far as the desert of the southwestern United States, producing spells of intensified shower activity embedded within the prevailing monsoon regime.

== Screaming eagle waves ==
A screaming eagle is a tropical wave with a convective pattern that loosely resembles the head of an eagle. This phenomenon is caused by shearing from either westerly winds aloft or strong easterly winds at the surface. These systems are typically located within 25 degrees latitude of the equator. Rain showers and surface winds gusting to 47 km/h (29 mph) are associated with these waves. They move across the ocean at a rate of 24 km/h (15 mph). Strong thunderstorm activity can be associated with the features when located east of a tropical upper tropospheric trough. The term was first publicly seen in an Air Force satellite interpretation handbook written by Hank Brandli in 1976. In 1969, Brandli discovered that a storm of this type threatened the original splashdown site for Apollo 11.

== Gallery ==
Hurricane Sandy as a tropical wave below Hispaniola on October 20, 2012

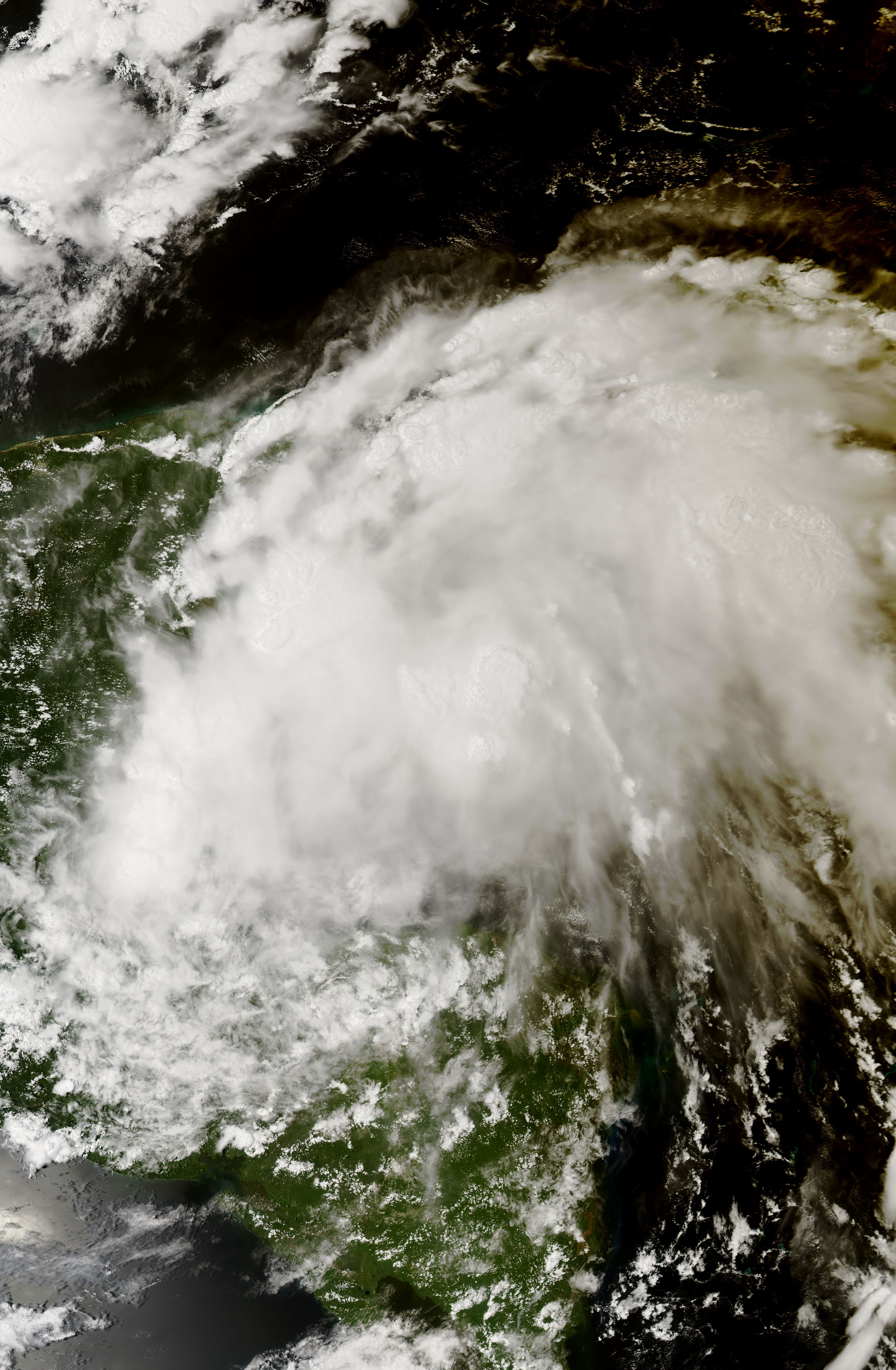
Hurricane Harvey as a tropical wave in the Gulf of Honduras on August 21, 2017

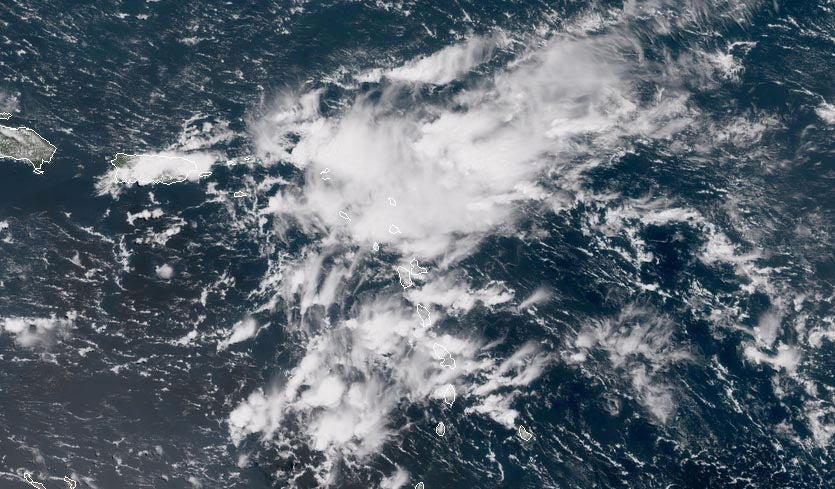
Tropical Storm Gordon as a tropical wave off the coast of Puerto Rico on August 29, 2018

Tropical Storm Gaston out in the Atlantic as a tropical wave on September 4, 2010

Tropical Storm Chantal transitioning back to a tropical wave on July 10, 2013

A tropical wave moving off the western coast of Africa, below Cape Verde on July 22, 2013

== See also ==
- Cape Verde hurricane
- Hovmöller diagram
- Tropical cyclone
- Tropical cyclogenesis
