= Paul Julian (meteorologist) =

American meteorologist

Paul R. Julian
- Born: Paul Rowland Julian; October 12, 1929 (age 97); La Porte, Indiana, United States
- Education: Pennsylvania State University
- Scientific career
- Fields: Meteorology
- Workplaces: National Center for Atmospheric Research (NCAR), 1962-1987
- Thesis: (1960)
- Doctoral advisor: Hans A. Panofsky

Paul Rowland Julian (born October 12, 1929), a Fellow of the American Meteorological Society, is an American meteorologist who served as a longtime staff scientist at the National Center for Atmospheric Research (NCAR), was co-author with Roland Madden of the study establishing the Madden–Julian oscillation (MJO), and contributed to the international, multi-institutional Global Atmospheric Research Program (GARP), Tropical Wind, Energy Conversion, and Reference Level Experiment (TWERLE), and Tropical Ocean-Global Atmosphere (TOGA) meteorology research programs. The MJO meteorologic phenomenon he co-discovered is the largest element of the intraseasonal variability in the tropical atmosphere, a traveling pattern arising from large-scale coupling between atmospheric circulation and tropical deep convection. Description of the MJO remains an important contribution to climate research with relevance to modern short- and long-term weather and climate modeling.

== Early life and education ==
Julian was born on October 12, 1929, and graduated from La Porte High School in 1947. He received an undergraduate physics degree from DePauw University in 1951, and a PhD in meteorology from Pennsylvania State University.

== Career ==
=== Employment by the NCAR ===
Julian joined the National Center for Atmospheric Research (NCAR), an early program of the National Science Foundation, as a staff scientist in 1962, two years into NCAR's existence There, he was a member of the Climate Analysis Section (CAS) in the CGD (Climate and Global Dynamics) area. Julian left NCAR circa 1987.

=== Discovery of the Madden-Julian Oscillation ===
Julian and Roland A. Madden co-authored a 1971 research publication entitled "Detection of a 40-50 day oscillation in the zonal wind in the tropical Pacific", which became the basis of the accepted Madden–Julian oscillation (MJO), a theory that remains in teaching and practice in climate research. The MJO is the largest element of intraseasonal variability of the atmosphere in the tropics; it is a traveling pattern arising from large-scale coupling between atmospheric circulation and tropical deep convection. (The El Niño–Southern Oscillation is a related phenomenon, but a standing pattern.) The ability to identify and forecast the MJO "is of considerable importance" in the ability of meteorologists to predict short-term variability in climate, and to perform long-term predictions of tropical and subtropical weather based on modeling. Both of these two atmospheric scientists continued research on the MJO phenomenon throughout their careers, and it has continued to be broadly referenced and studied into the new millennium.

=== Other career highlights ===
In addition to continuing work on the MJO, Julian performed oceanic meteorological work at Ascension Island in the equatorial waters of the South Atlantic Ocean and at Kanton Island of the Phoenix Islands, in the Republic of Kiribati.

Julian also contributed to two broad, international, multi-institutional meteorology research studies (still accessible at the NCAR research consortium):

- Global Atmospheric Research Program records, (GARP, 1966–1979), and
- Tropical Wind, Energy Conversion, and Reference Level Experiment records (TWERLE, 1969–1978),

in addition to NCAR's Atmospheric Technology Division records (ATD, 1964–2002), and his personal research papers (1962–1978).

Julian worked concurrently and later from the Mathematics Department at Dalhousie University in Halifax, Nova Scotia, where he continued effort associated with the Global Atmospheric Research Program (GARP), e.g., serving on the workshop organizing committee for the First GARP Global Experiment (FGGE) and in other atmospheric research related activities. In 1998, Julian and collaborators contributed to an important international review of the decade-long Tropical Ocean-Global Atmosphere (TOGA) observing system (>400 citations as of May 2014).

As of 2014, Julian continues in the position of longstanding active Fellow of the American Meteorological Society (AMS).

== Personal life ==
Julian is retired and has pursued various activities, including a genealogic study of families with his surname, which was published in 2004.
