= Hovmöller diagram =

Diagram for plotting meteorological data highlighting wave behavior

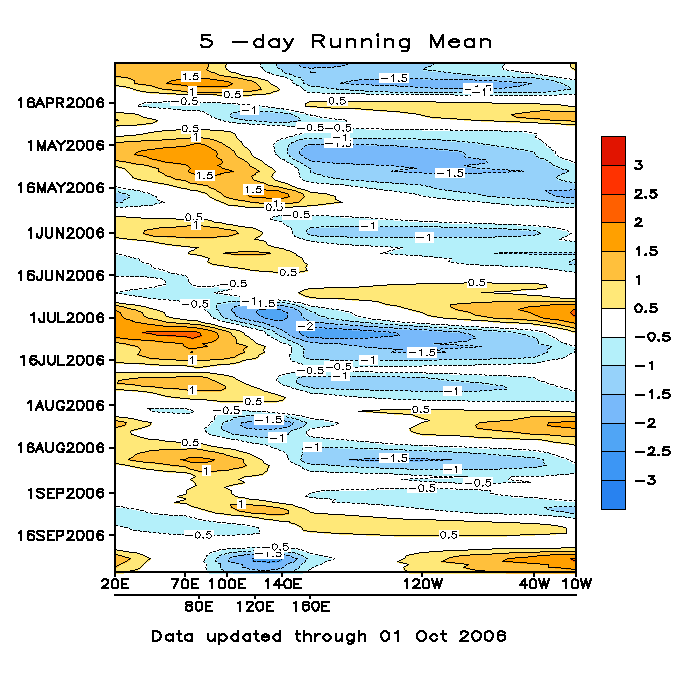
This Hovmöller diagram records a running mean value of outgoing longwave radiation, OLR, which produces contour-values (here shown from +3 to –3) of the Madden–Julian oscillation, MJO. Here, time increases from top to bottom, i.e., vertically, along the ordinate, or y-axis; while the oscillation contours are oriented from left to right, horizontally, on the abscissa, or x-axis. Thus, over calendar time from April to September, the movements of any specific contour-value are depicted as from west to east—that is, from 20E longitude to 10W longitude.

A Hovmöller diagram is a common way of plotting meteorological data to highlight the behavior of waves, particularly tropical waves. The axes of Hovmöller diagrams depict changes over time of scalar quantities such as temperature, density, and other values of constituents in the atmosphere or ocean, such as depth, height, or pressure. Typically in that case, time is recorded along the abscissa, or x-axis, while 'vertical' values (of depth, height, pressure, etc.) are plotted along the ordinate, or y-axis.

The alternate orientation of axes may also be used, as a Hovmöller diagram may be plotted for longitude or latitude on the abscissa and for (advancing) time on the ordinate; then the contour values of a named physical field may be presented through color or shading.

The Hovmöller diagram was introduced by Ernest Aabo Hovmöller (1912–2008), a Danish meteorologist, in a paper published in 1949.

== See also ==
- Tropical wave
- Heat map
