= Madden–Julian oscillation =

Tropical atmosphere element of variability

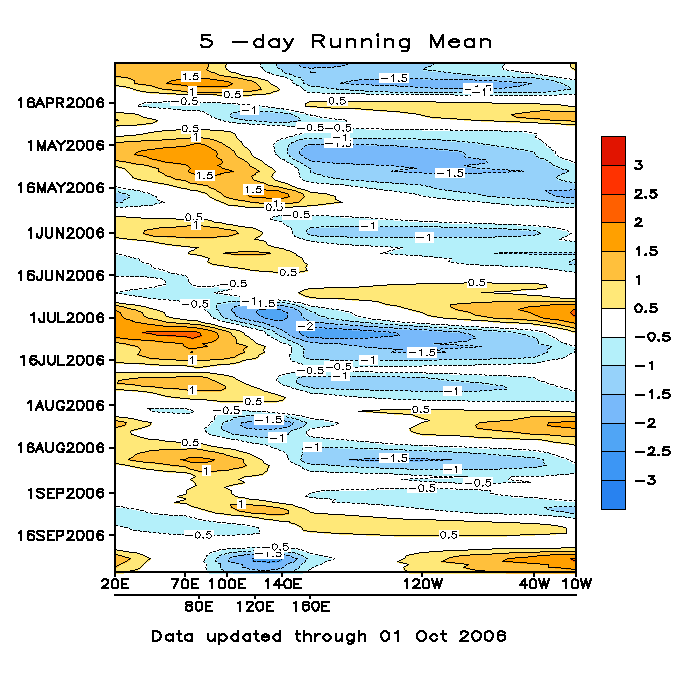
A Hovmöller diagram of the 5-day running mean of outgoing longwave radiation showing the MJO. Time increases from top to bottom in the figure, so contours that are oriented from upper-left to lower-right represent movement from west to east.

The Madden–Julian oscillation (MJO) is the largest element of the intraseasonal (30- to 90-day) variability in the tropical atmosphere. It was discovered in 1971 by Roland Madden and Paul Julian of the American National Center for Atmospheric Research (NCAR). It is a large-scale coupling between atmospheric circulation and tropical deep atmospheric convection. Unlike a standing pattern like the El Niño–Southern Oscillation (ENSO), the Madden–Julian oscillation is a traveling pattern that propagates eastward, at approximately 4 to 8 m/s (14 to 29 km/h; 9 to 18 mph), through the atmosphere above the warm parts of the Indian and Pacific oceans. This overall circulation pattern manifests itself most clearly as anomalous rainfall.

The Madden–Julian oscillation is characterized by an eastward progression of large regions of both enhanced and suppressed tropical rainfall, observed mainly over the Indian and Pacific Ocean. The anomalous rainfall is usually first evident over the western Indian Ocean, and remains evident as it propagates over the very warm ocean waters of the western and central tropical Pacific. This pattern of tropical rainfall generally becomes nondescript as it moves over the primarily cooler ocean waters of the eastern Pacific, but reappears when passing over the warmer waters over the Pacific Coast of Central America.

The pattern may also occasionally reappear at low amplitude over the tropical Atlantic and higher amplitude over the Indian Ocean. The wet phase of enhanced convection and precipitation is followed by a dry phase where thunderstorm activity is suppressed. Each cycle lasts approximately 30–60 days. Because of this pattern, the Madden–Julian oscillation is also known as the 30- to 60-day oscillation, 30- to 60-day wave, or intraseasonal oscillation.

== Behavior ==
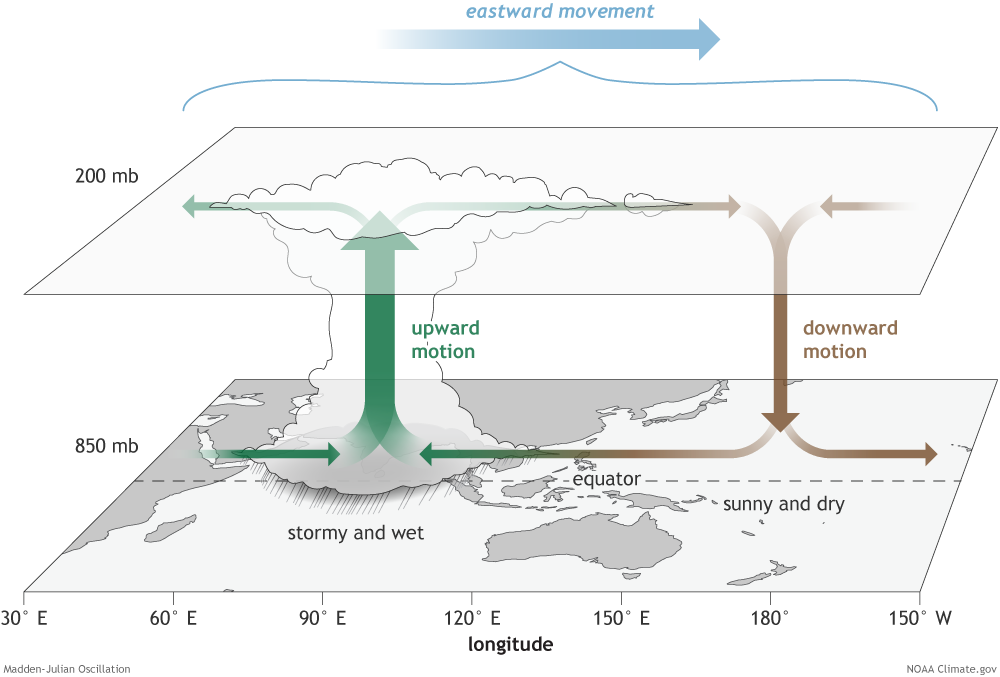
The structure of the MJO for a period when the enhanced convective phase is centered across the Indian Ocean and the suppressed convective phase is centered over the west-central Pacific Ocean

Distinct patterns of lower-level and upper-level atmospheric circulation anomalies accompany the MJO-related pattern of enhanced or decreased tropical rainfall across the tropics. These circulation features extend around the globe and are not confined to only the eastern hemisphere. The Madden–Julian oscillation moves eastward at between 4 m/s (14 km/h, 9 mph) and 8 m/s (29 km/h, 18 mph) across the tropics, crossing the Earth's tropics in 30 to 60 days—with the active phase of the MJO tracked by the degree of outgoing long wave radiation, which is measured by infrared-sensing geostationary weather satellites. The lower the amount of outgoing longwave radiation, the stronger the thunderstorm complexes, or convection, is within that region.

Enhanced surface (upper-level) westerly winds occur near the west (east) side of the active convection. Ocean currents, up to 100 metres (330 ft) in depth from the ocean surface, follow in phase with the east-wind component of the surface winds. In advance, or to the east, of the MJO enhanced activity, winds aloft are westerly. In its wake, or to the west of the enhanced rainfall area, winds aloft are easterly. These wind changes aloft are due to the divergence present over the active thunderstorms during the enhanced phase. Its direct influence can be tracked poleward as far as 30 degrees latitude from the equator in both northern and southern hemispheres, propagating outward from its origin near the equator at around 1 degree latitude, or 111 kilometres (69 mi), per day.

=== Phases and monitoring ===
The MJO is classified into eight phases depending on the location of enhanced precipitation along the Equator:

- Phases 8 and 1: Western Hemisphere and Africa
- Phases 2 and 3: Indian Ocean
- Phases 4 and 5: Maritime Continent
- Phases 6 and 7: Western Pacific

The position and strength of the MJO is determined by the Real-time Multivariate MJO (RMM) index, which takes into account the equatorial distribution of outgoing longwave radiation and the zonal winds at low (850 hPa) and high (200 hPa) altitudes.

=== Irregularities ===
The MJO's movement around the globe can occasionally slow or stall during the Northern Hemisphere summer and early autumn, leading to consistently enhanced rainfall for one side of the globe and consistently depressed rainfall for the other side. This can also happen early in the year. The MJO can also go quiet for a period of time, which leads to non-anomalous storm activity in each region of the globe.

== Local effects ==
=== Connection to the monsoon ===
Onset dates and prevailing wind currents of the southwest summer monsoon in India.

During the Northern Hemisphere summer season the MJO-related effects on the Indian and West African summer monsoon are well documented. MJO-related effects on the North American summer monsoon also occur, though they are relatively weaker. MJO-related impacts on the North American summer precipitation patterns are strongly linked to meridional (i.e. north–south) adjustments of the precipitation pattern in the eastern tropical Pacific. A strong relationship between the leading mode of intraseasonal variability of the North American Monsoon System, the MJO and the points of origin of tropical cyclones is also present.

A period of warming sea surface temperatures is found five to ten days prior to a strengthening of MJO-related precipitation across southern Asia. A break in the Asian monsoon, normally during the month of July, has been attributed to the Madden–Julian oscillation after its enhanced phase moves off to the east of the region into the open tropical Pacific Ocean.

=== Influence on tropical cyclogenesis ===
Tropical cyclones occur throughout the boreal warm season (typically May–November) in both the north Pacific and the north Atlantic basins—but any given year has periods of enhanced or suppressed activity within the season. Evidence suggests that the Madden–Julian oscillation modulates this activity (particularly for the strongest storms) by providing a large-scale environment that is favorable (or unfavorable) for development. MJO-related descending motion is not favorable for tropical storm development.

However, MJO-related ascending motion is a favorable pattern for thunderstorm formation within the tropics, which is quite favorable for tropical storm development. As the MJO progresses eastward, the favored region for tropical cyclone activity also shifts eastward from the western Pacific to the eastern Pacific and finally to the Atlantic basin.

An inverse relationship exists between tropical cyclone activity in the western north Pacific basin and the north Atlantic basin, however. When one basin is active, the other is normally quiet, and vice versa. The main reason for this appears to be the phase of the MJO, which is normally in opposite modes between the two basins at any given time. While this relationship appears robust, the MJO is one of many factors that contribute to the development of tropical cyclones. For example, sea surface temperatures must be sufficiently warm and vertical wind shear must be sufficiently weak for tropical disturbances to form and persist.

However, the MJO also influences these conditions that facilitate or suppress tropical cyclone formation. The MJO is monitored routinely by both the USA National Hurricane Center and the USA Climate Prediction Center during the Atlantic hurricane (tropical cyclone) season to aid in anticipating periods of relative activity or inactivity.

=== Influence on African rainfall ===
The MJO signal is well defined in parts of Africa including in the Congo Basin and East Africa. During the major rainy seasons in East Africa (March to May and October to December), rainfall tends to be lower when the MJO convective core is over the eastern Pacific, and higher when convection peaks over the Indian Ocean. During 'wet' phases, the normal easterly winds weaken, while during 'dry' phases, the easterly winds strengthen.

An increase in frequency of MJO phases with convective activity over the eastern Pacific might have contributed to the drying trend seen in the Congo Basin in the last few decades.

== Downstream effects ==
=== Link to the El Niño-Southern oscillation ===
There is strong year-to-year (interannual) variability in Madden–Julian oscillation activity, with long periods of strong activity followed by periods in which the oscillation is weak or absent. This interannual variability of the MJO is partly linked to the El Niño–Southern Oscillation (ENSO) cycle. In the Pacific, strong MJO activity is often observed 6 to 12 months prior to the onset of an El Niño episode, but is virtually absent during the maxima of some El Niño episodes, while MJO activity is typically greater during a La Niña episode. Strong events in the Madden–Julian oscillation over a series of months in the western Pacific can speed the development of an El Niño or La Niña but usually do not in themselves lead to the onset of a warm or cold ENSO event. However, observations suggest that the 1982-1983 El Niño developed rapidly during July 1982 in direct response to a Kelvin wave triggered by an MJO event during late May.

Changes in the structure of the MJO with the seasonal cycle and ENSO might facilitate more substantial impacts of the MJO on ENSO. For example, the surface westerly winds associated with active MJO convection are stronger during advancement toward El Niño and the surface easterly winds associated with the suppressed convective phase are stronger during advancement toward La Niña. Globally, the interannual variability of the MJO is most determined by atmospheric internal dynamics, rather than surface conditions.

=== North American winter precipitation ===
The strongest impacts of intraseasonal variability on the United States occur during the winter months over the western U.S. During the winter this region receives the bulk of its annual precipitation. Storms in this region can last for several days or more and are often accompanied by persistent atmospheric circulation features. Of particular concern are extreme precipitation events linked to flooding. Strong evidence suggests a link between weather and climate in this region from studies that have related the El Niño Southern Oscillation to regional precipitation variability.

In the tropical Pacific, winters with weak-to-moderate cold, or La Niña, episodes or ENSO-neutral conditions are often characterized by enhanced 30- to 60-day Madden–Julian oscillation activity. A recent example is the winter of 1996–1997, which featured heavy flooding in California and in the Pacific Northwest (estimated damage costs of $2.0–3.0 billion at the time of the event) and a very active MJO. Such winters are also characterized by relatively small sea surface temperature anomalies in the tropical Pacific compared to stronger warm and cold episodes. In these winters, there is a stronger link between the MJO events and extreme west coast precipitation events.

==== Pineapple Express events ====
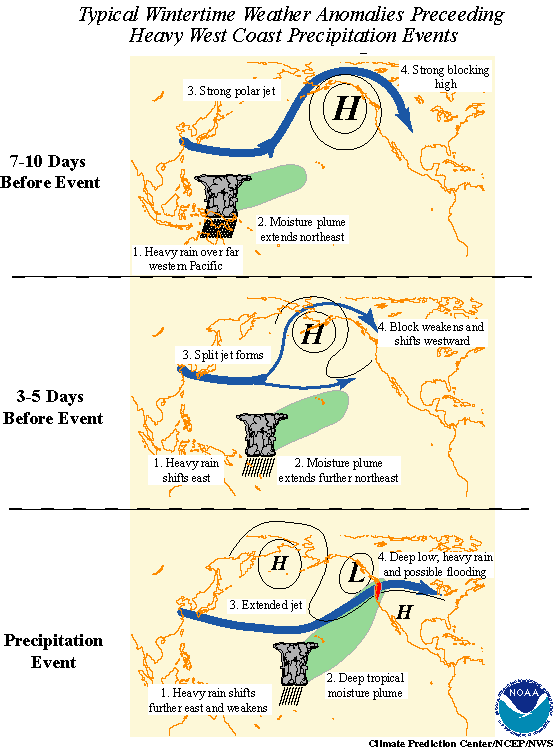
The Pineapple Express, an MJO effect on North American weather patterns.

The typical scenario linking the pattern of tropical rainfall associated with the MJO to extreme precipitation events in the Pacific Northwest features a progressive (i.e. eastward moving) circulation pattern in the tropics and a retrograding (i.e. westward moving) circulation pattern in the mid latitudes of the North Pacific. Typical wintertime weather anomalies preceding heavy precipitation events in the Pacific Northwest are as follows:

1. 7–10 days prior to the heavy precipitation event: Heavy tropical rainfall associated with the MJO shifts eastward from the eastern Indian Ocean to the western tropical Pacific. A moisture plume extends northeastward from the western tropical Pacific towards the general vicinity of the Hawaiian Islands. A strong blocking anticyclone is located in the Gulf of Alaska with a strong polar jet stream around its northern flank.
2. 3–5 days prior to the heavy precipitation event: Heavy tropical rainfall shifts eastward towards the date line and begins to diminish. The associated moisture plume extends further to the northeast, often traversing the Hawaiian Islands. The strong blocking high weakens and shifts westward. A split in the North Pacific jet stream develops, characterized by an increase in the amplitude and areal extent of the upper tropospheric westerly zonal winds on the southern flank of the block and a decrease on its northern flank. The tropical and extra tropical circulation patterns begin to "phase", allowing a developing mid latitude trough to tap the moisture plume extending from the deep tropics.
3. The heavy precipitation event: As the pattern of enhanced tropical rainfall continues to shift further to the east and weaken, the deep tropical moisture plume extends from the subtropical central Pacific into the mid latitude trough now located off the west coast of North America. The jet stream at upper levels extends across the North Pacific with the mean jet position entering North America in the northwestern United States. The deep low pressure located near the Pacific Northwest coast can bring up to several days of heavy rain and possible flooding. These events are often referred to as Pineapple Express events, so named because a significant amount of the deep tropical moisture traverses the Hawaiian Islands on its way towards western North America.

Throughout this evolution, retrogression of the large-scale atmospheric circulation features is observed in the eastern Pacific–North American sector. Many of these events are characterized by the progression of the heaviest precipitation from south to north along the Pacific Northwest coast over a period of several days to more than one week. However, it is important to differentiate the individual synoptic-scale storms, which generally move west to east, from the overall large-scale pattern, which exhibits retrogression.

A coherent simultaneous relationship exists between the longitudinal position of maximum MJO-related rainfall and the location of extreme west coast precipitation events. Extreme events in the Pacific Northwest are accompanied by enhanced precipitation over the western tropical Pacific and the region of Southeast Asia called by meteorologists the Maritime Continent, with suppressed precipitation over the Indian Ocean and the central Pacific. As the region of interest shifts from the Pacific Northwest to California, the region of enhanced tropical precipitation shifts further to the east. For example, extreme rainfall events in southern California are typically accompanied by enhanced precipitation near 170°E. However, the overall link between the MJO and extreme west coast precipitation events weakens as the region of interest shifts southward along the west coast of the United States.

There is case-to-case variability in the amplitude and longitudinal extent of the MJO-related precipitation, so this should be viewed as a general relationship only.

== Impact of climate change on MJO ==
The MJO travels a stretch of 12,000–20,000 km over the tropical oceans, mainly over the Indo-Pacific warm pool, which has ocean temperatures generally warmer than 28 °C. This Indo-Pacific warm pool has been warming rapidly, which has altered the residence time of MJO over the tropical oceans and strengthened MJO's convection. While the total lifespan of MJO remains in the 30–60 day timescale, its residence time has shortened over the Indian Ocean by 3–4 days (from an average of 19 days to 15 days) and increased by 5–6 days over the West Pacific (from an average of 18 days to 23 days). This change in the residence time of MJO has altered the rainfall patterns across the globe.
