= Tropical Warm Pool =

Warm mass in the western Pacific and eastern Indian oceans

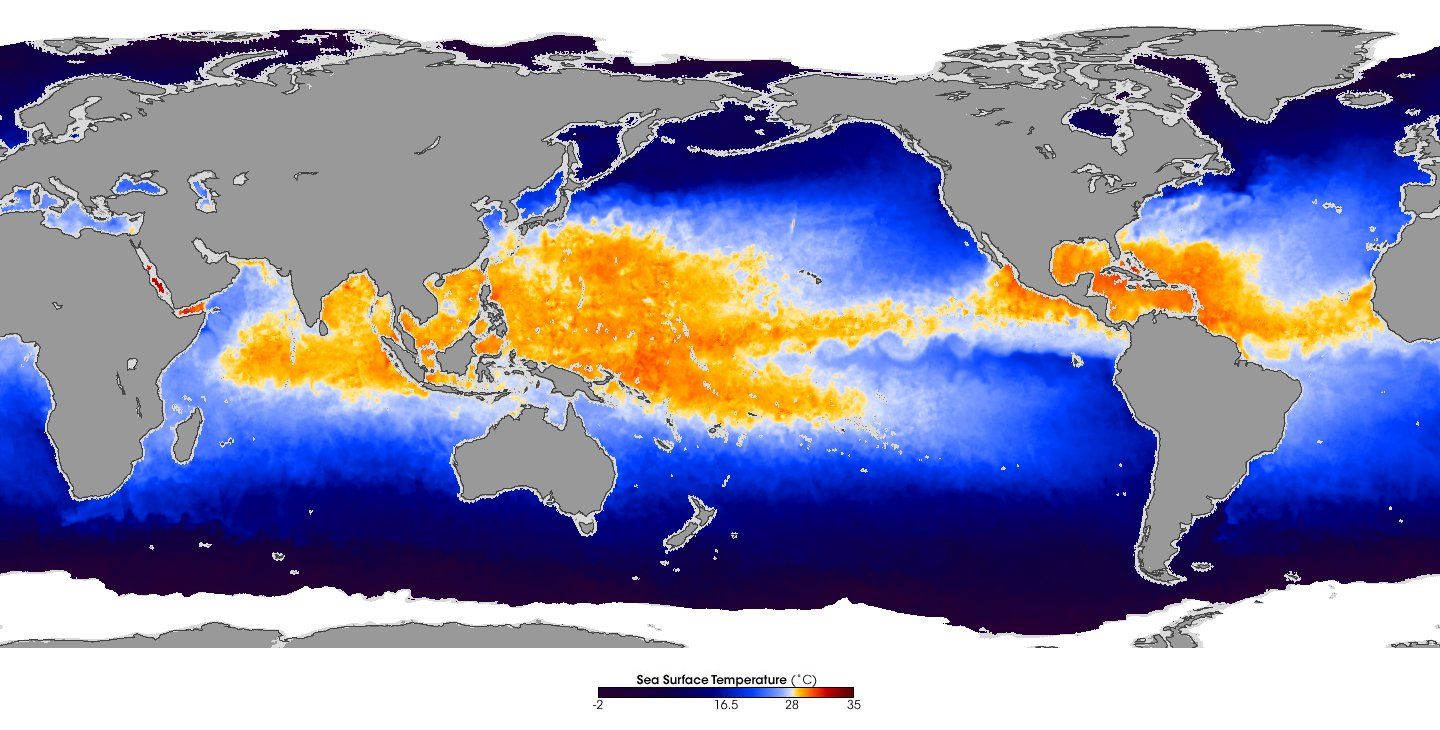
Thermal satellite image of worldwide ocean temperatures, with the Indo-Pacific Warm Pool centered.

In oceanology, the Tropical Warm Pool (TWP) or Indo-Pacific Warm Pool (IPWP) is a mass of ocean water located in the western Pacific Ocean and eastern Indian Ocean which consistently exhibits the highest water temperatures over the largest expanse of the Earth's surface. Climate change and the Intertropical Convergence Zone have been increasingly affecting the warming of the IPWP.

== History ==
The Tropical Western Pacific waters hold the ocean's warmest waters. This area is also referred to as the Western Pacific Warm Pool, which is a part of the larger Indo-Pacific Warm Pool. Annual sea surface temperatures in this area reach above 28 degrees celsius. As a result of higher sea surface temperatures, the IPWP is a source of warm moisture. Ultimately leading to heavy local rainfall. High water temperatures are due to seasonal changes in precipitation along the path of the Great Ocean Conveyor Belt, from the western Pacific Ocean across the Indonesian Archipelago into the eastern Indian Ocean. Its intensity and extent appear to oscillate over a time period measured in decades.

== Climate change effects ==
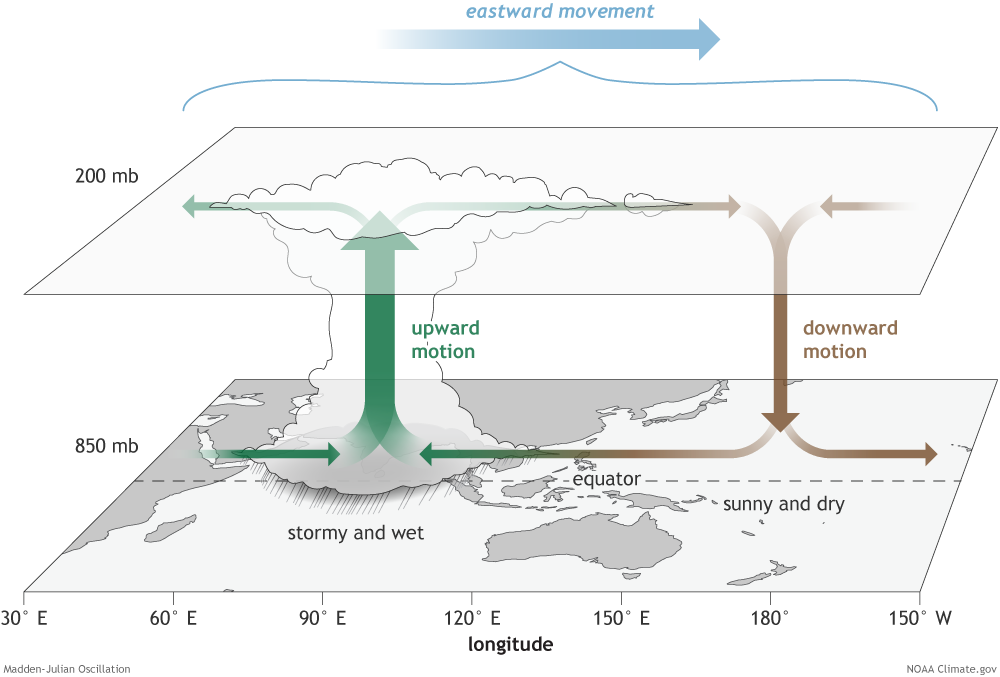
Madden-Julian Oscillation Diagram

The Indo-Pacific warm pool has been warming rapidly and expanding during the recent decades, largely from climate change in response to increased carbon emissions from fossil fuel burning. The warm pool nearly doubled in size, from an area of 22 million km^{2} during 1900–1980, to an area of 40 million km^{2} during 1981–2018; however, latest research suggests that this expansion rate may be overestimated. This expansion of the warm pool has allowed more cyclones as well as altered global rainfall patterns and variations by changing the life cycle of the Madden Julian Oscillation (MJO), which is the most dominant mode of weather fluctuation originating in the tropics. This oscillation is showcased by eastward movement of suppressed tropical rainfall, specifically over the Pacific and Indian Oceans.

== Intertropical Convergent Zone ==
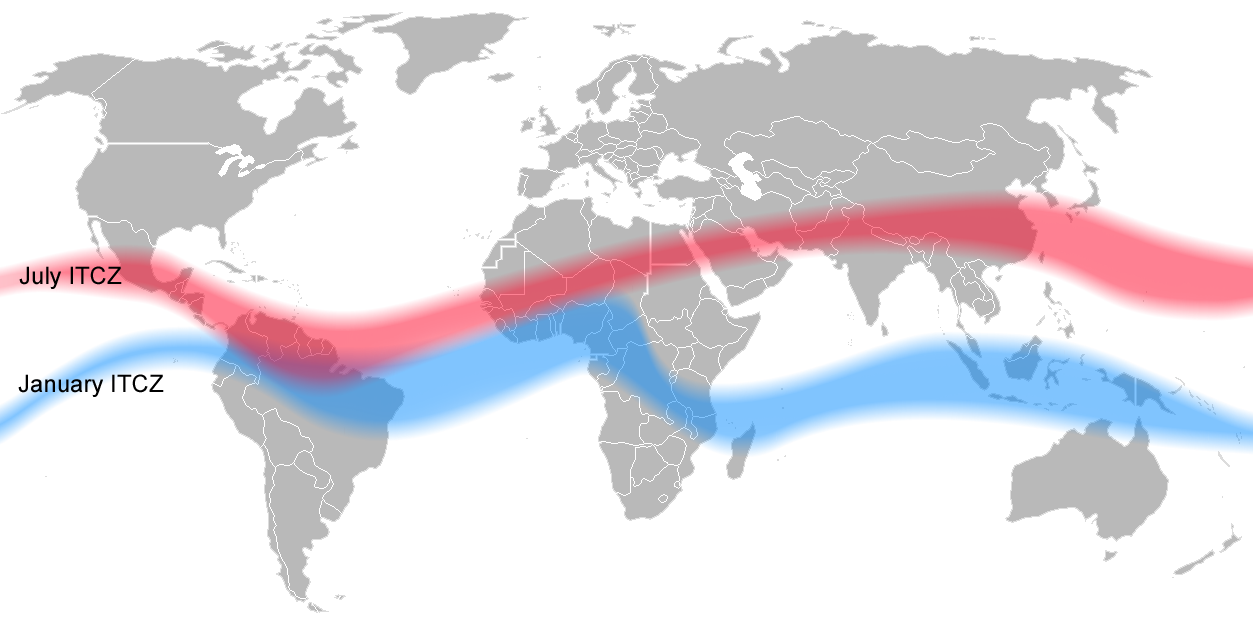
Intertropical Convergence Zone across the globe, with emphasis on January-July

The Hadley circulation's ascending branch includes the Intertropical Convergent Zone (ITCZ), a narrow tropical area of wind convergence and maximal surface moist static energy. The Asian-Australian monsoons are caused by the rainbelt's latitudinal migration and the winds that accompany it. Significant seasonal variations in the local SST are caused by variations in the monsoonal activity, which impact the wind direction and intensity over the IPWP. In particular, the seasonal reversal of the monsoonal winds affects the Indian Ocean sector of the IPWP, which includes the Timor, Arafura, and Banda Seas. This results in the upwelling of colder waters by Ekman transport.

== See also ==
- Maritime Continent
