= 1986 Pacific typhoon season =

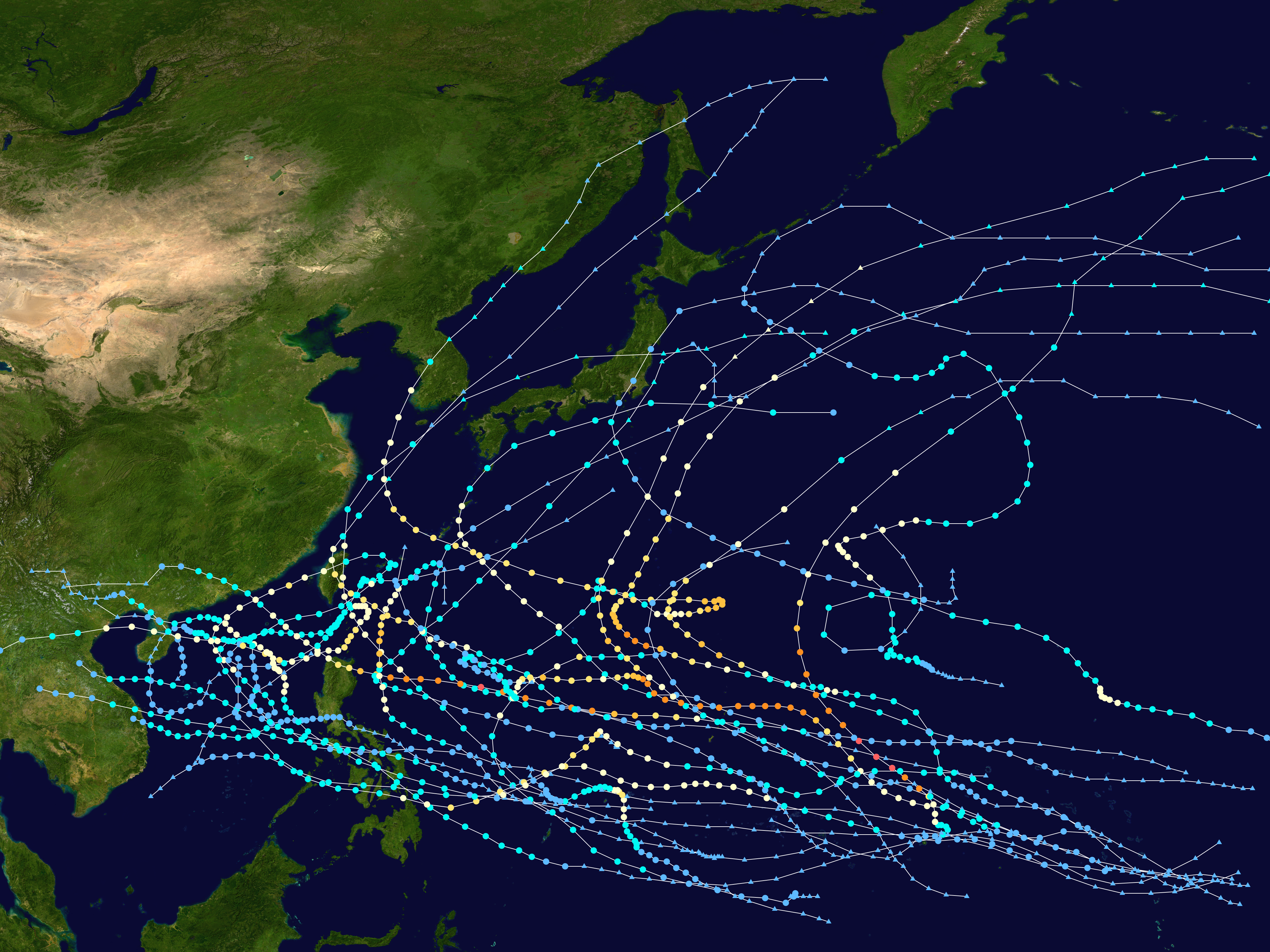
- Season summary map

Seasonal boundaries
- First system formed: January 29, 1986
- Last system dissipated: January 3, 1987

Strongest storm
- Name: Peggy
  - Maximum winds: 205 km/h (125 mph) (10-minute sustained)
  - Lowest pressure: 900 hPa (mbar)

Seasonal statistics
- Total depressions: 48
- Total storms: 29
- Typhoons: 19
- Very strong typhoons: 11
- Violent typhoons: 3
- Total fatalities: 905 total
- Total damage: ≥ $508.5 million (1986 USD)

Related articles
- 1986 Atlantic hurricane season; 1986 Pacific hurricane season; 1986 North Indian Ocean cyclone season

The 1986 Pacific typhoon season was an above average season, featuring 29 named storms, 19 typhoons, and 3 super typhoons. It has no official bounds; it ran year-round in 1986, but most tropical cyclones tend to form in the northwestern Pacific Ocean between May and December. These dates conventionally delimit the period of each year when most tropical cyclones form in the northwestern Pacific Ocean. Tropical Storms formed in the entire west pacific basin were assigned a name by the Joint Typhoon Warning Center. Tropical depressions that enter or form in the Philippine area of responsibility are assigned a name by the Philippine Atmospheric, Geophysical and Astronomical Services Administration or PAGASA. This can often result in the same storm having two names.

A total of 32 tropical depressions formed in 1986 in the Western Pacific over an eleven-month time span. Of the 32, 30 became tropical storms, 19 storms reached typhoon intensity, and 3 reached super typhoon strength. The Joint Typhoon Warning Center considered Vera as two tropical cyclones, when all the warning centers treated Vera as one in real time, while another, Georgette, originated in the Eastern Pacific. Six of the tropical cyclones formed in August, which was the busiest month of the season. Eight tropical cyclones moved through the Philippines this season. Most of the deaths attributed to typhoons in 1986 were caused by Peggy and Wayne.

== Seasonal summary ==
Of the thirty tropical storms formed in 1986 in the Western Pacific (from 32 tropical depressions), 19 reached typhoon intensity, and three reached super typhoon strength. Broken down by month, one tropical cyclone formed in February, one in April, two in May, three in June, three in July, seven in August, three in September, four in October, six in November, and two forming in December. Vera was considered two tropical cyclones by the Joint Typhoon Warning Center after the fact, though it was operationally treated as one system, and Georgette, was a former Eastern Pacific cyclone. Eight tropical cyclones moved through the Philippines this season, while three struck mainland China, one struck Korea, and one crossed the Japanese coast. Peggy and Wayne accounted for a majority of the death toll this season. Tropical cyclones accounted for 35 percent of the annual rainfall in Hong Kong this year.

== Systems ==
=== Typhoon Judy (Akang) ===
- Typhoon (JMA)
- Category 2 typhoon (SSHWS)
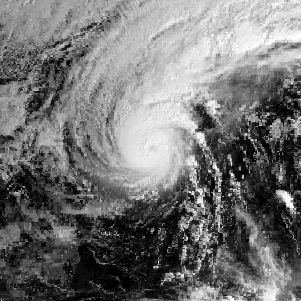
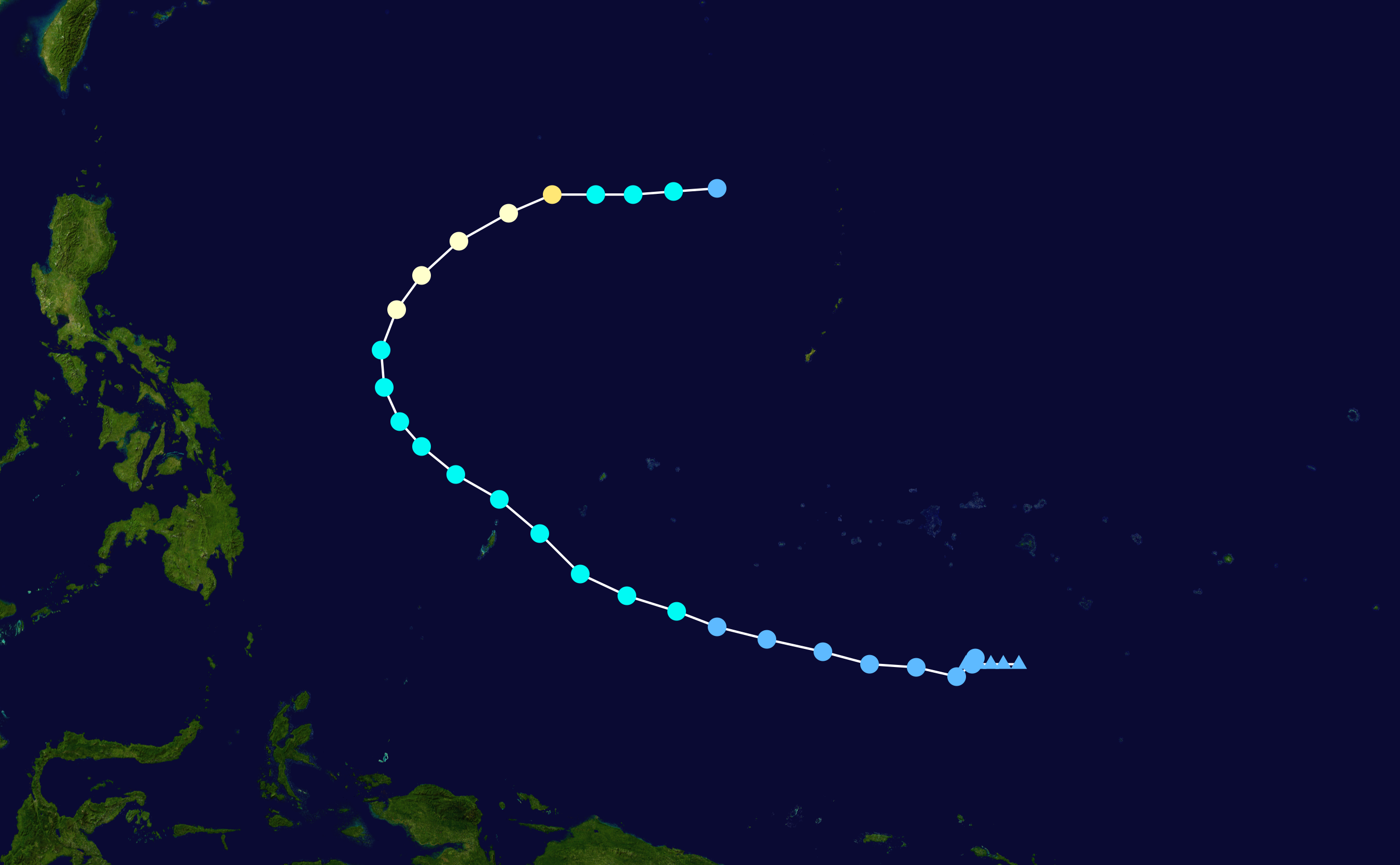
- Duration: February 1 – February 6
- Peak intensity: 130 km/h (80 mph) (10-min); 970 hPa (mbar)

The initial disturbance formed within two degrees of the equator within the monsoon trough on January 25. Over succeeding days, the thunderstorm area increased in size. However, it decreased significantly on January 30. As the convective area moved slowly westward, it increased in coverage once more, organizing into a tropical depression on February 1. Moving on a parabolic course east of the Philippines, Judy gained tropical storm status on February 2, and typhoon strength on February 4 after recurving to the northwest of the subtropical ridge. As westerly winds increased aloft, vertical wind shear weakened Judy back into a tropical storm, which lost tropical characteristics on February 6. After drifting slightly more east-northeastward, the low-pressure area dissipated.

=== Typhoon Ken (Bising) ===
- Typhoon (JMA)
- Category 2 typhoon (SSHWS)
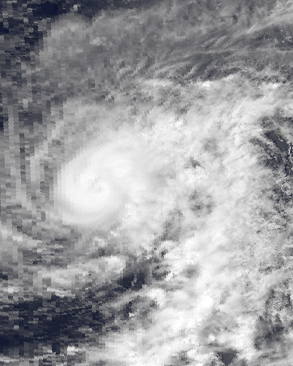
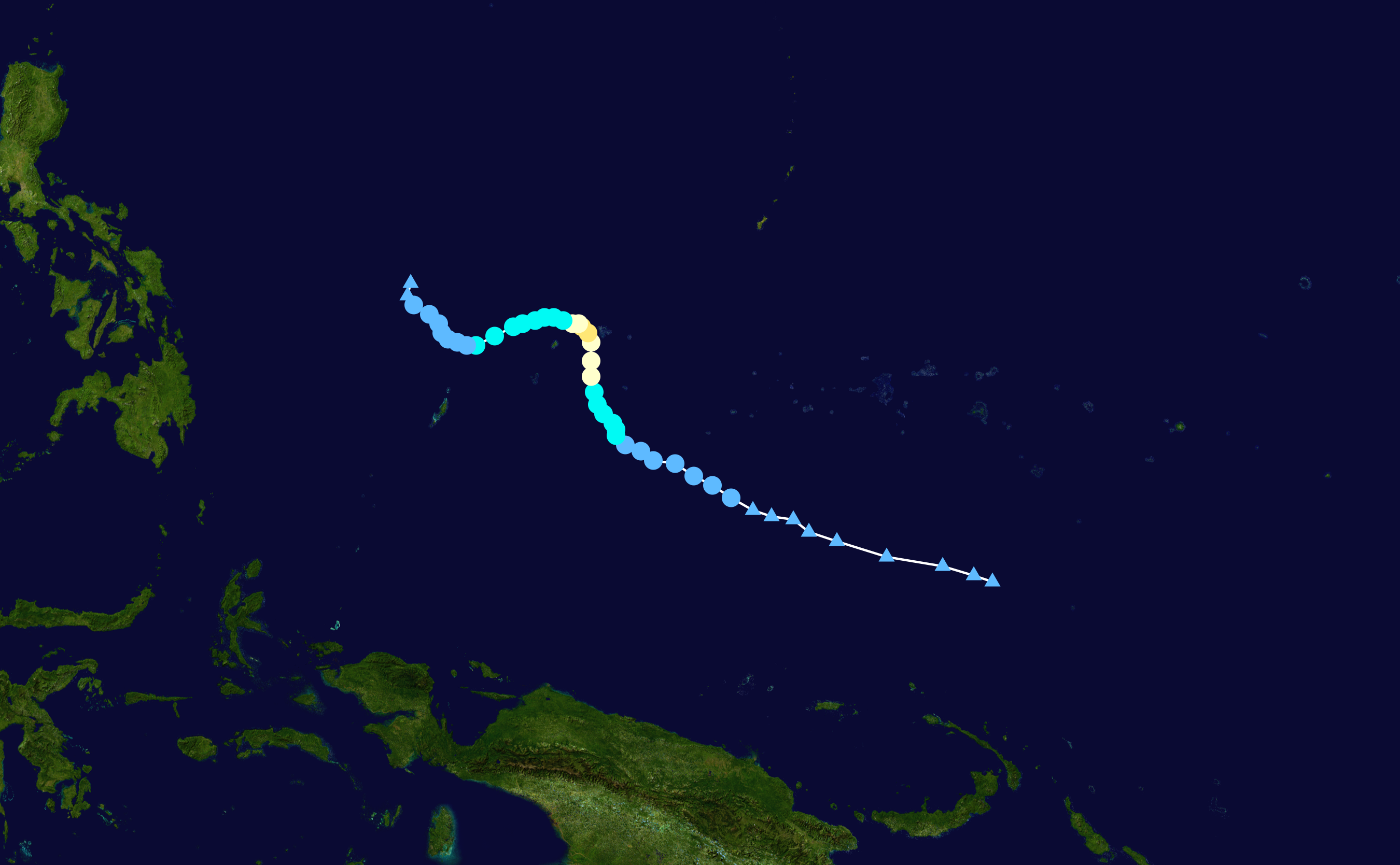
- Duration: April 26 – May 3
- Peak intensity: 120 km/h (75 mph) (10-min); 980 hPa (mbar)

A tropical disturbance formed along the near equatorial trough on April 20 well to the south of Guam. The system slowly increased in organization, becoming a tropical depression on April 26. The system quickly developed thereafter, becoming a typhoon on April 27 while moving northward. The system reached its peak intensity on April 28. The subtropical ridge built to its northwest, steering Ken to the west. South-westerly vertical wind shear led to a weakening trend to begin on April 29. On April 30, Ken's low level circulation was exposed, no longer having any thunderstorms near the center. The remnant low drifted westward, dissipating by May 3. It was also formed after Chernobyl Disaster.

=== Typhoon Lola ===
- Violent typhoon (JMA)
- Category 5 super typhoon (SSHWS)
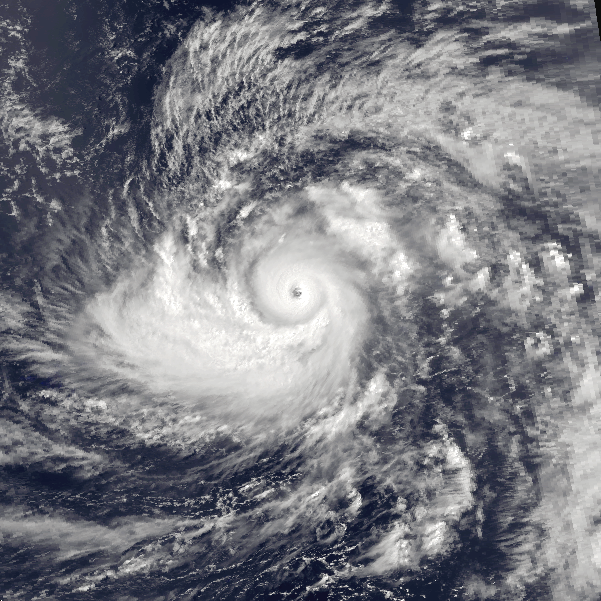
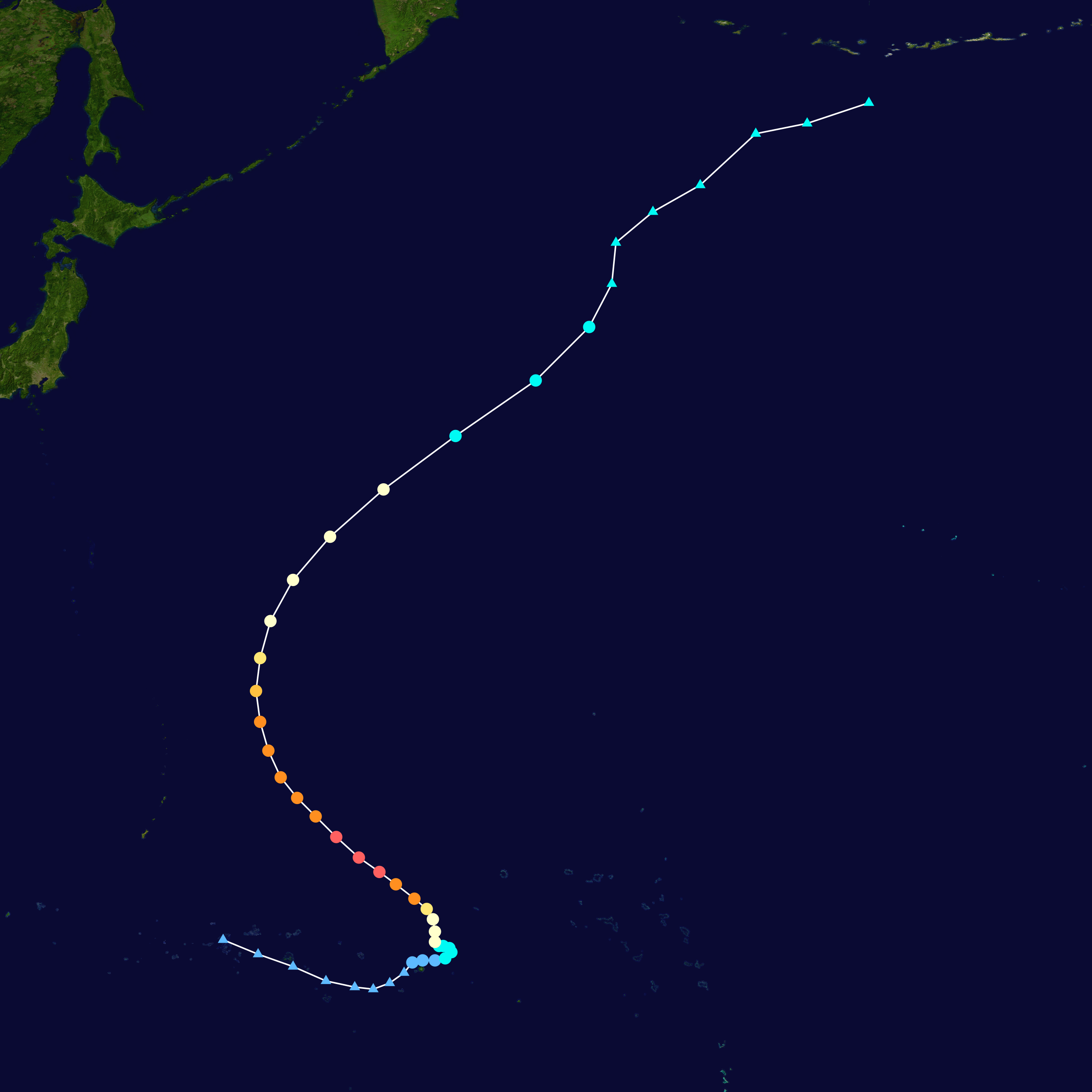
- Duration: May 17 – May 23
- Peak intensity: 220 km/h (140 mph) (10-min); 910 hPa (mbar)

Forming as a twin cyclone with South Pacific's Cyclone Namu, the initial disturbance of Lola developed within the monsoon trough south of Guam. Moving eastward, the system slowly developed becoming a tropical depression, then a tropical storm, on May 17. Lola moved over Pohnpei, becoming their most destructive cyclone since 1958. In light of the damage caused by the storm, the island was declared a major disaster area on June 3 by the American government. Continuing to intensify, Lola became a typhoon on May 18 and turned northwest. Rapid intensification continued, with Lola becoming a super typhoon on May 19. Peaking in intensity on May 20, Lola recurved to the north and northeast, weakening into a tropical storm on May 23 and evolving into an extratropical cyclone later that day.

=== Tropical Storm Mac (Klaring) ===
- Tropical storm (JMA)
- Tropical storm (SSHWS)
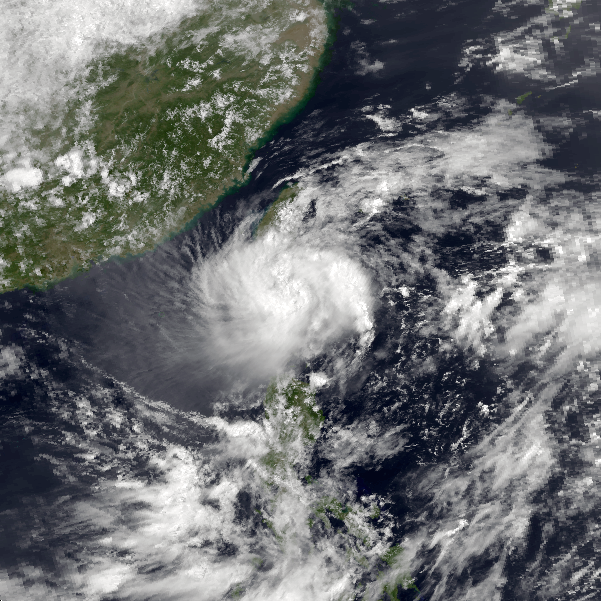
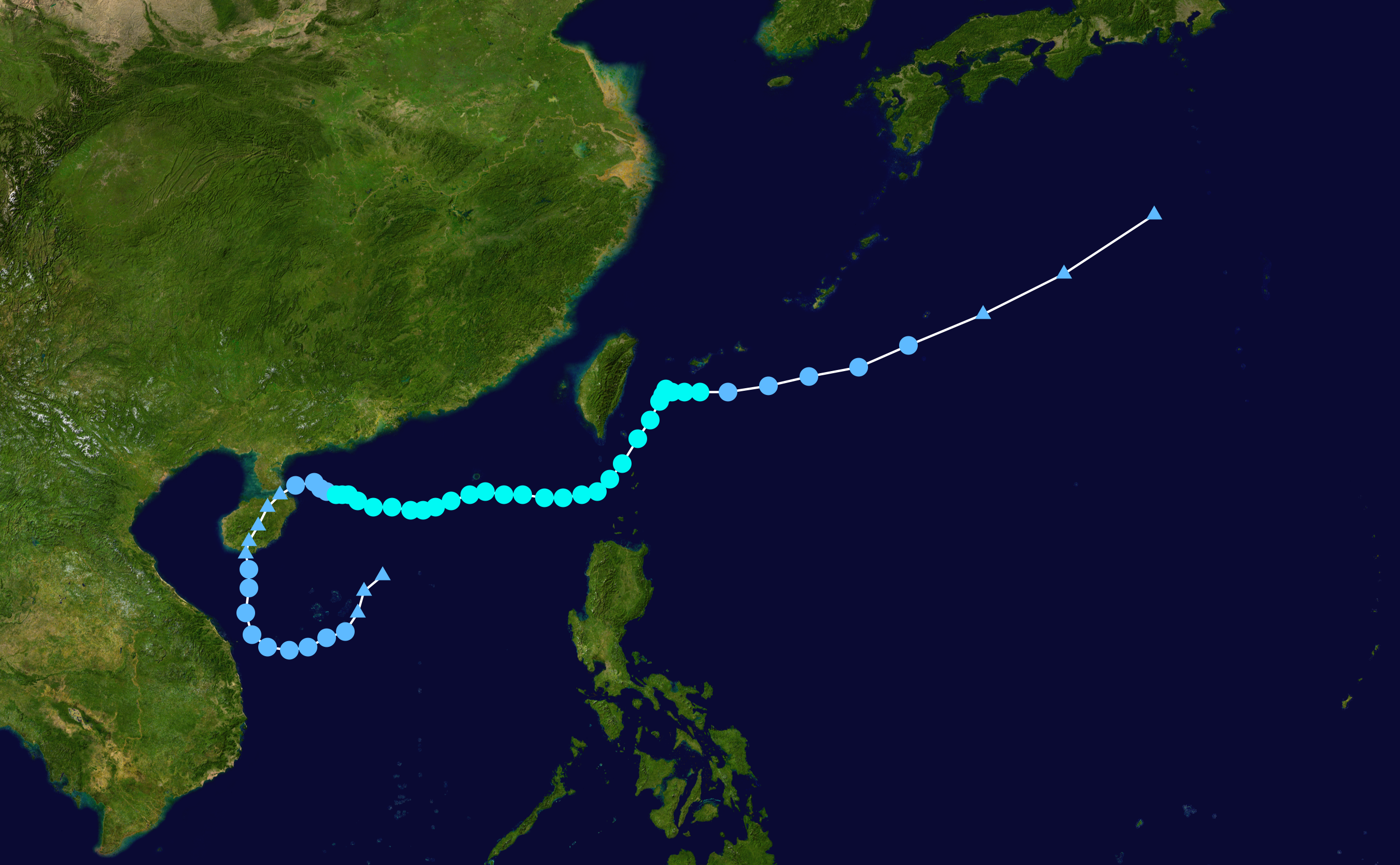
- Duration: May 21 – May 29
- Peak intensity: 75 km/h (45 mph) (10-min); 992 hPa (mbar)

This system moved generally to the east-northeast throughout its life cycle. Forming near Hainan Island on May 21 as a monsoon depression, the initial tropical disturbance moved through the South China Sea while slowly organizing. Becoming a tropical depression in the Formosa Strait, Mac quickly became a tropical storm and turned northeast, paralleling the coast of Taiwan. On May 27, Mac turned back towards the east-northeast as upper level westerly winds increased, causing vertical wind shear which led to Mac weakening into a tropical depression before dissipating on May 29.

=== Typhoon Nancy (Deling) ===
- Typhoon (JMA)
- Category 1 typhoon (SSHWS)
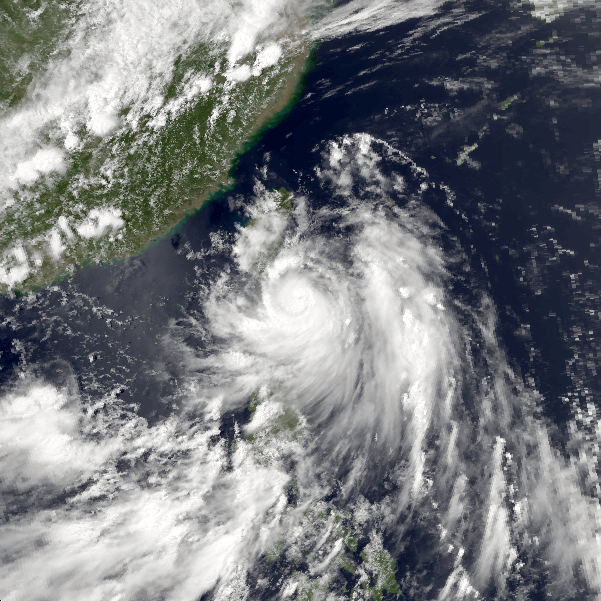
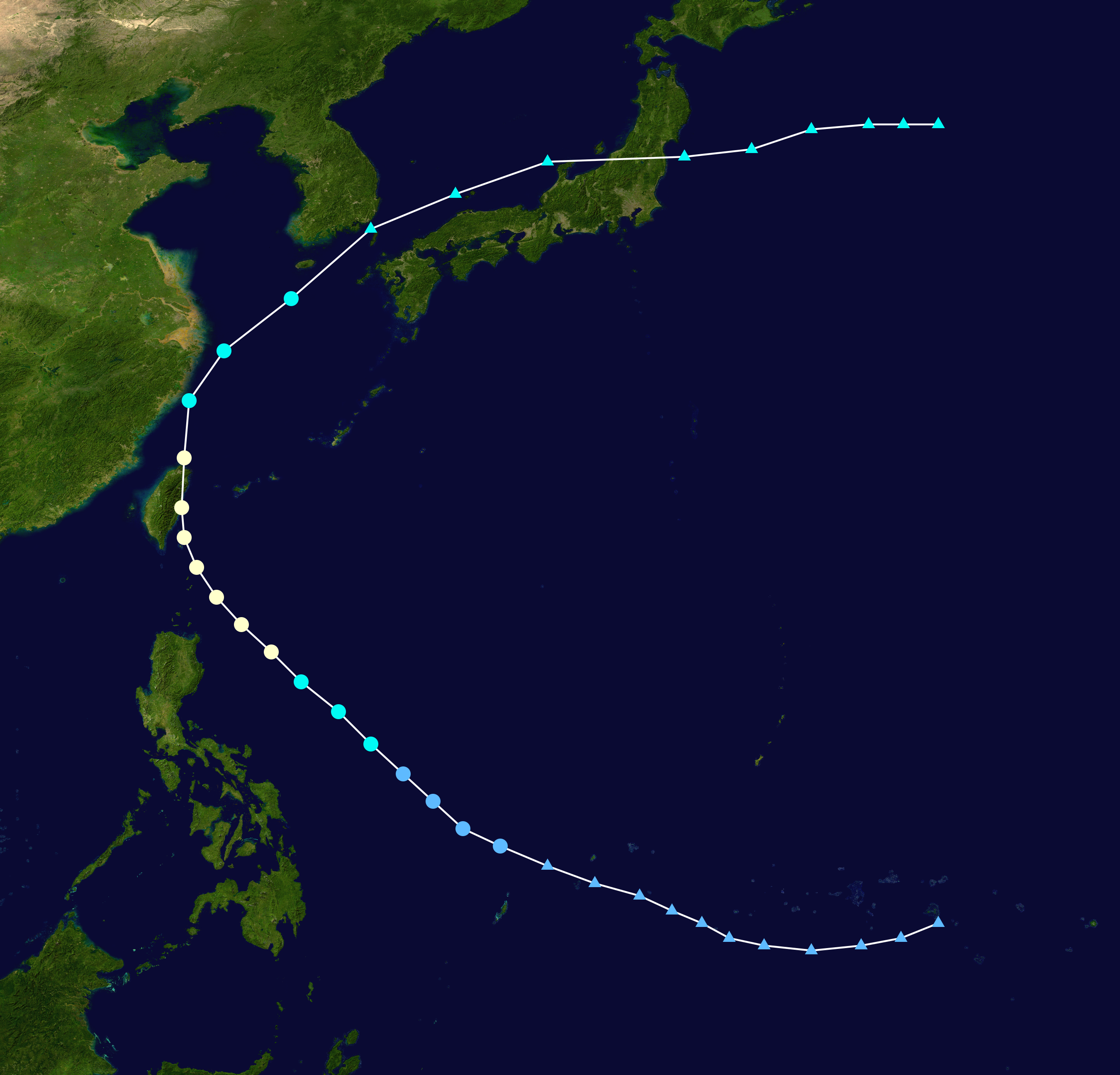
- Duration: June 21 – June 25
- Peak intensity: 130 km/h (80 mph) (10-min); 955 hPa (mbar)

A broad area of convection formed to the southeast of Pohnpei in mid June. The convection formed a tropical depression on June 21 to the east of the Philippines. Tropical Storm Nancy was named the next and quickly strengthened into a typhoon with max winds of 75 kn (139 km/h) before striking northeastern Taiwan. After departing the island Nancy weakened to tropical storm strength while moving north through the East China Sea. Nancy passed through the Korea Straits just before turning extratropical and accelerating northeastward into the Sea of Japan. Torrential rains fell throughout South Korea, as a result of flooding 12 people were killed and 22,477 acres (90.96 km^{2}) of farmland were destroyed.

=== Tropical Storm Owen (Emang) ===
- Tropical storm (JMA)
- Tropical storm (SSHWS)
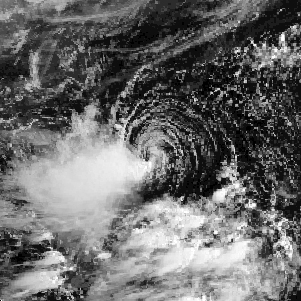
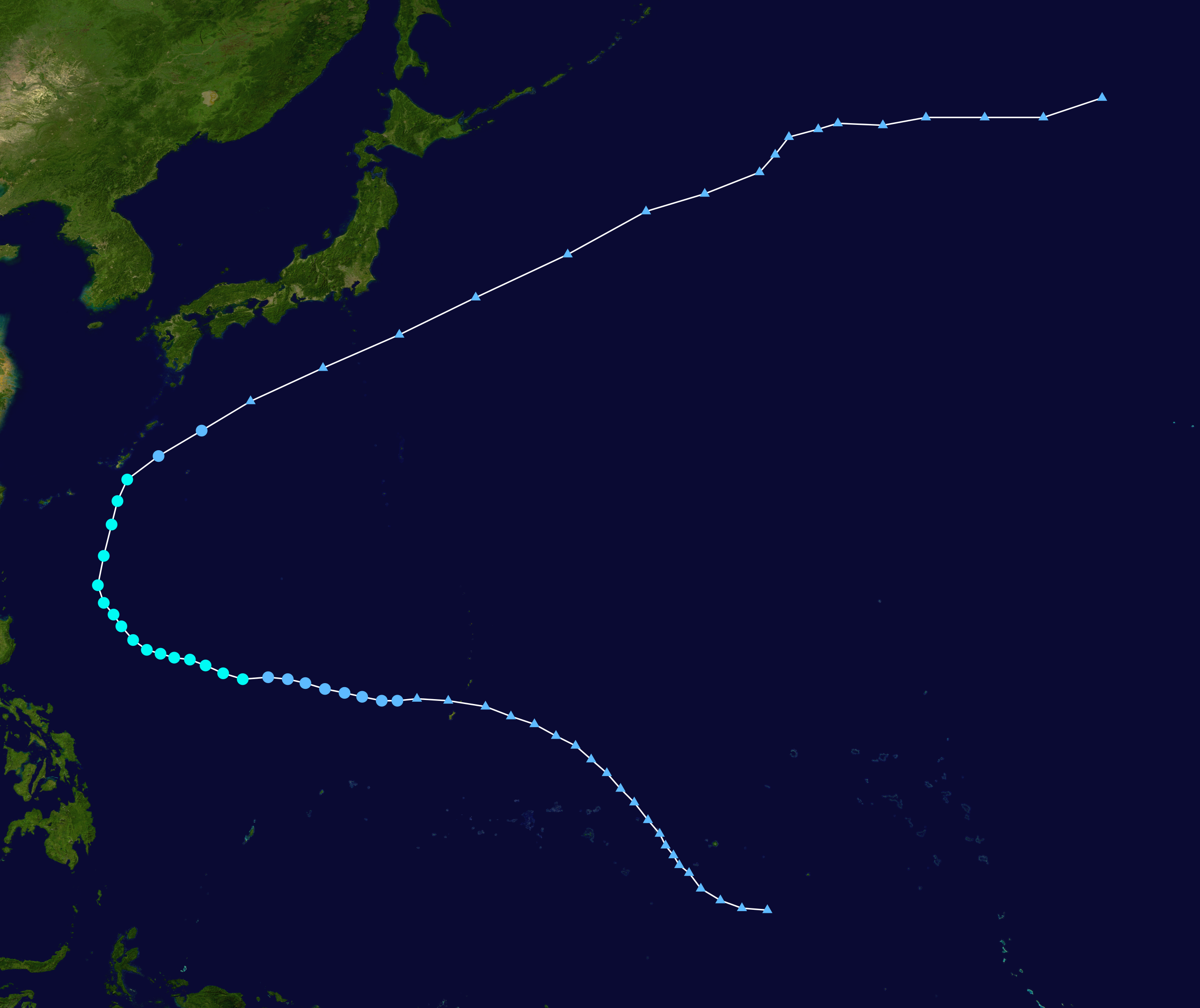
- Duration: June 28 – July 2
- Peak intensity: 85 km/h (50 mph) (10-min); 985 hPa (mbar)

Forming as a tropical disturbance southwest of Kosrae on June 21. Moving west-northwest, the system gradually became better organized. On June 28, the disturbance had organized into a tropical depression. Recurving east of the Philippines and Taiwan, Owen developed into a tropical storm, reaching its maximum intensity on June 29. Thereafter, east-northeasterly winds aloft led to vertical wind shear which weakened Owen. While moving north-northeast towards southern Japan, the system devolved into a low level circulation devoid of thunderstorms, and dissipated on July 2.

=== Typhoon Peggy (Gading) ===
- Violent typhoon (JMA)
- Category 5 super typhoon (SSHWS)
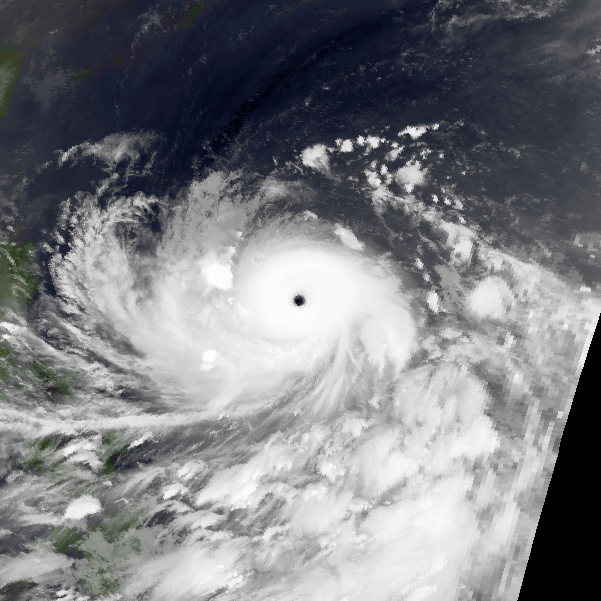
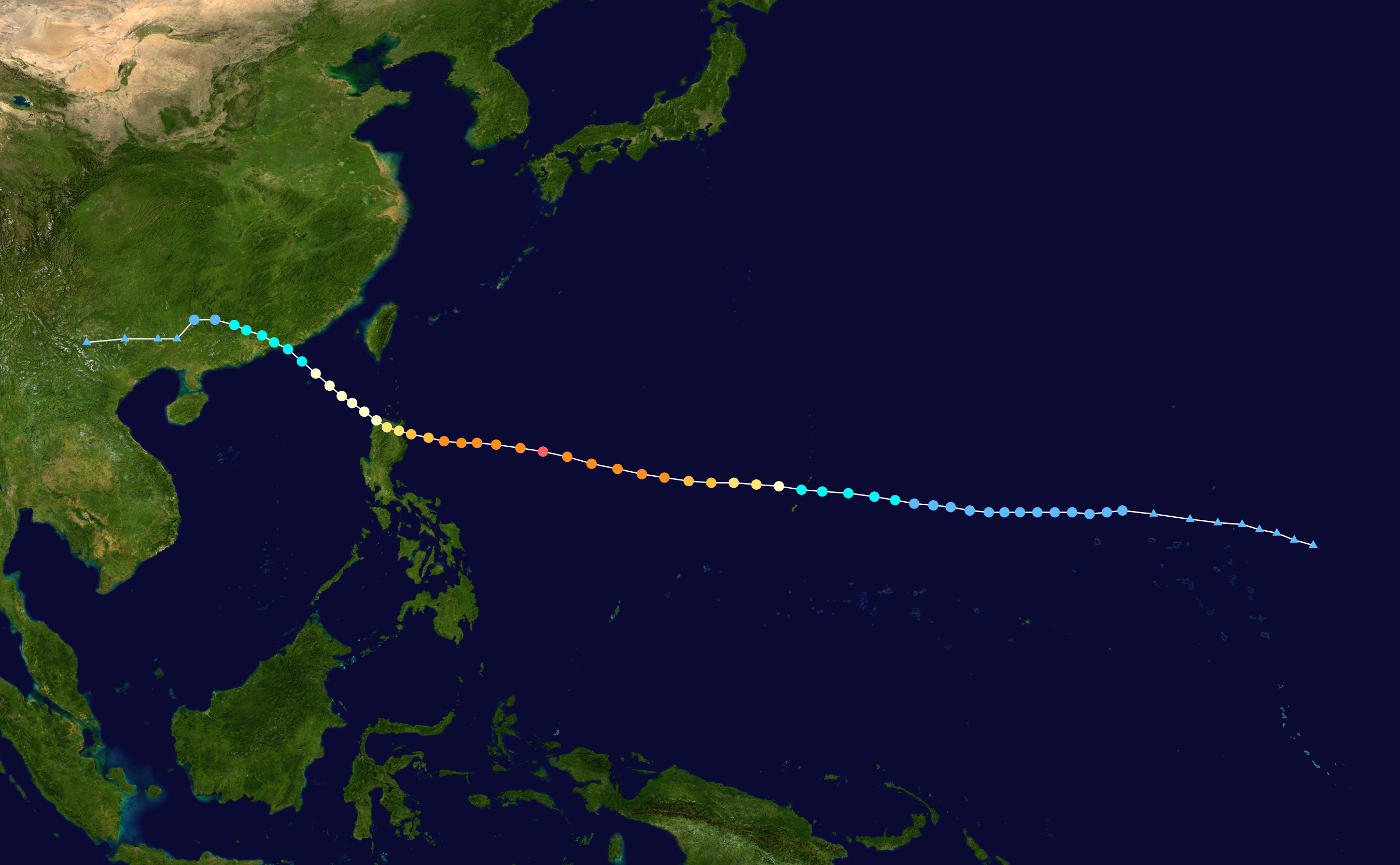
- Duration: July 3 – July 11
- Peak intensity: 205 km/h (125 mph) (10-min); 900 hPa (mbar)

Peggy, which developed on July 3 east of the Philippines, steadily strengthened to reach a peak of 130 knots (240 km/h) super typhoon on July 7. As Peggy continued westward, it slowly weakened, and hit northeastern Luzon on July 9 as a 90 kn (170 km/h) typhoon. A slight weakening of the subtropical ridge brought Peggy more northward, where it hit southeastern China as a 55 kn (102 km/h) tropical storm on the July 11. In Hong Kong, winds gusted to 78 knots (144 km/h) at Tate's Cairn and rainfall totals reached 449 millimetres (17.7 in) at Tai Mo Shan. Peggy's fury resulted in 333 casualties and US$2.5 million (1986 dollars) in damage from torrential flooding.

=== Typhoon Roger (Heling) ===
- Typhoon (JMA)
- Category 2 typhoon (SSHWS)
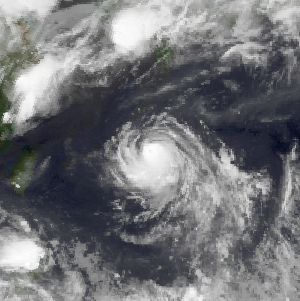
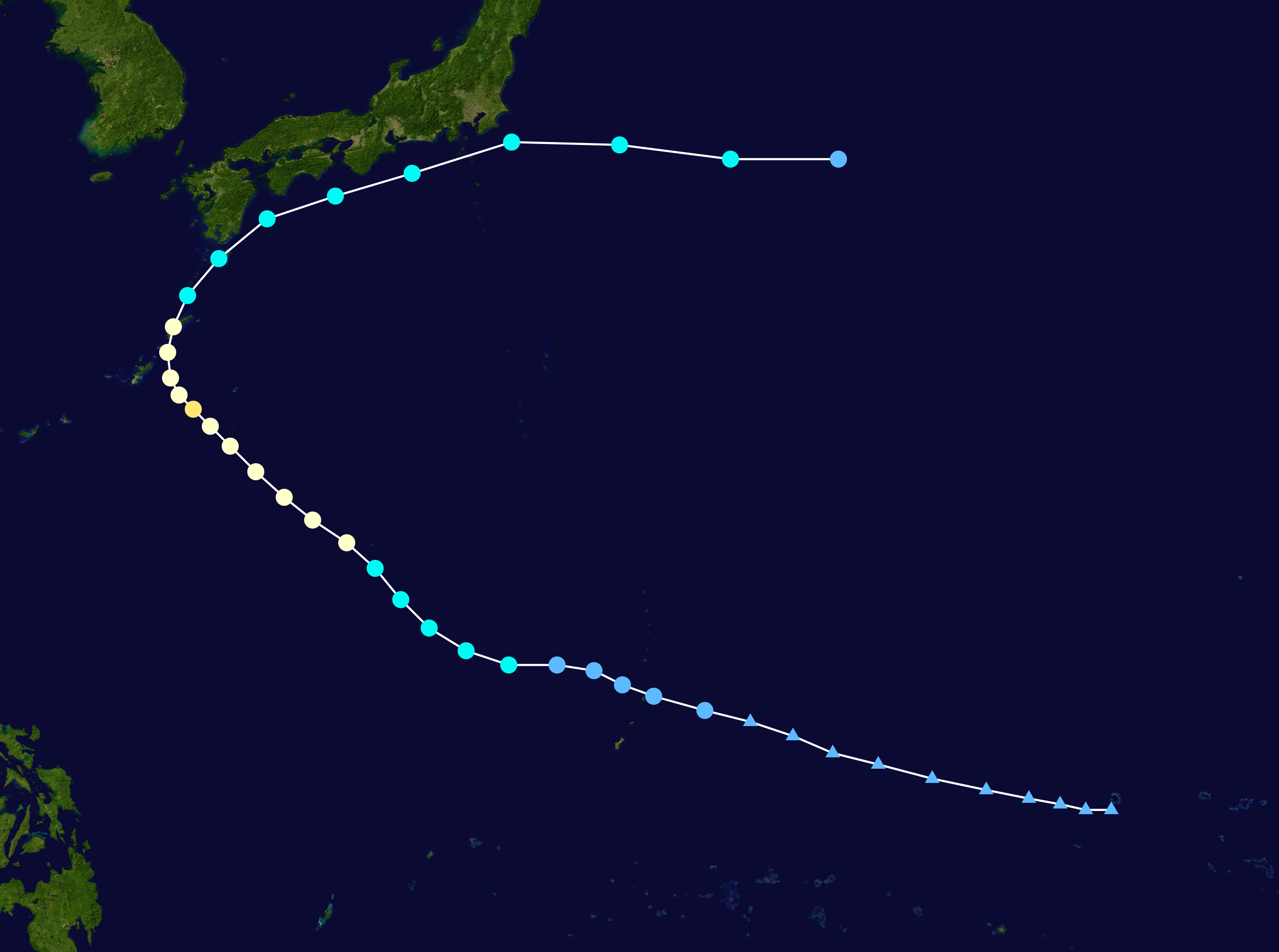
- Duration: July 13 – July 17
- Peak intensity: 140 km/h (85 mph) (10-min); 955 hPa (mbar)

An upper-level low retrograded westward across the tropical Pacific Ocean beginning on July 4. On July 8, a tropical disturbance formed southeast of the upper low southwest of Enewetak Atoll. The system moved westward, slowly organizing. Becoming a tropical depression on July 13, the small system turned northwest, recurving gradually around a subtropical ridge to its east and northeast. The system strengthened into a tropical storm later on July 13, and a typhoon on July 14 to the south of Japan. After turning to the northeast, the system began to experience northeasterly vertical wind shear and began to weaken. After passing east of Okinawa, the system began to transition into an extratropical cyclone, a process which completed on July 17 near the southern coast of Japan.

=== Tropical Storm Nine ===
- Tropical storm (JMA)
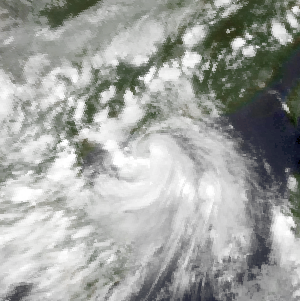
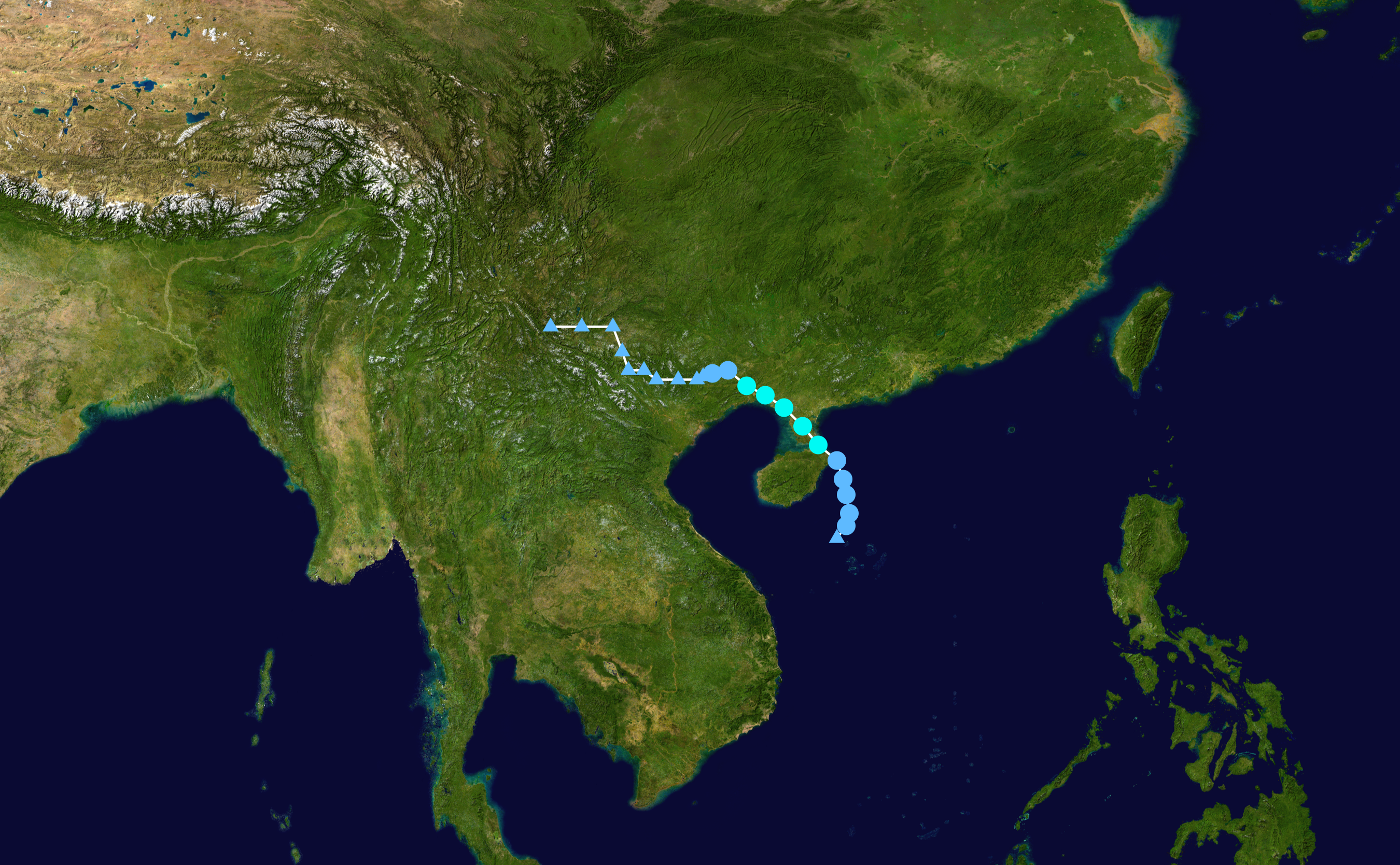
- Duration: July 20 – July 24
- Peak intensity: 65 km/h (40 mph) (10-min); 996 hPa (mbar)

Forming on the South China Sea on July 19, the cyclone moved northwest into mainland China on July 22, maintaining its circulation as it turned westward before dissipating on July 24. This system was recognized by the Japanese Meteorological Agency as a tropical storm.

=== Severe Tropical Storm Sarah (Iliang) ===
- Severe tropical storm (JMA)
- Tropical storm (SSHWS)
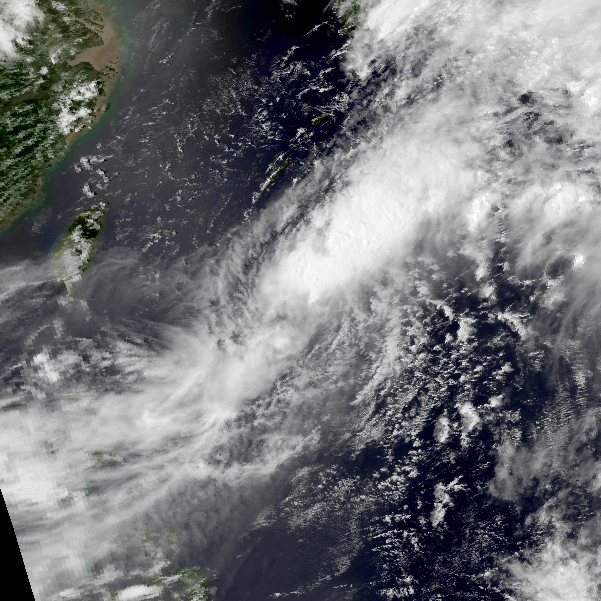
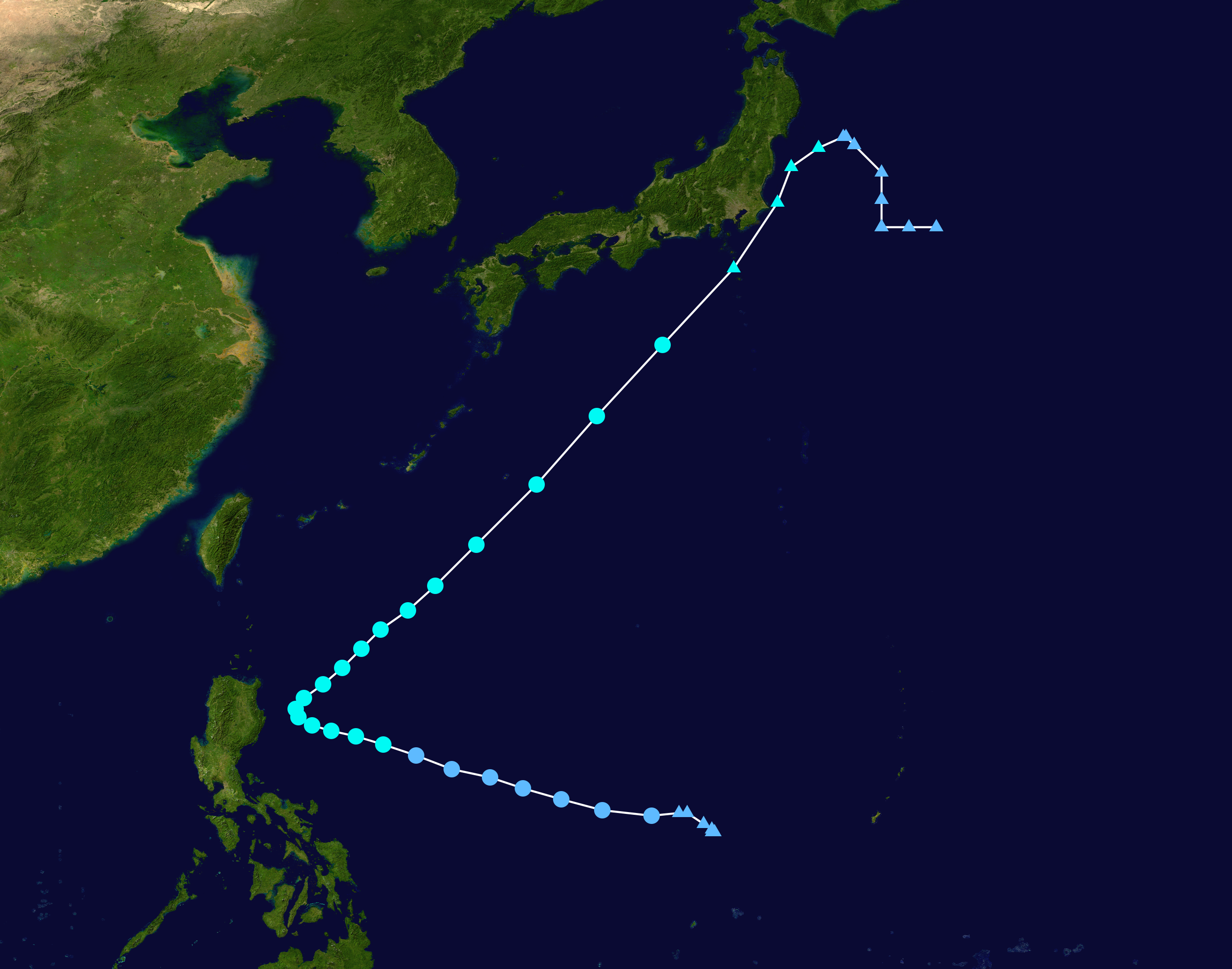
- Duration: July 30 – August 4
- Peak intensity: 100 km/h (65 mph) (10-min); 980 hPa (mbar)

Developing in the Philippine Sea on July 30, the system developed as it moved westward, becoming a tropical storm on July 31. On August 1, its mid-level circulation center crossed into the South China Sea while its surface circulation was left behind east of the Philippines. Sarah's broad circulation center was difficult to locate until it began moving northeast east of Luzon on August 2, when it intensified to its peak intensity. As Sarah moved east of Honshu, it evolved into an extratropical cyclone. Fourteen died in Japan due to Sarah. Damages totaled to ¥105.5 billion (US$627 million).

=== Severe Tropical Storm Georgette ===
- Severe tropical storm (JMA)
- Category 1 typhoon (SSHWS)
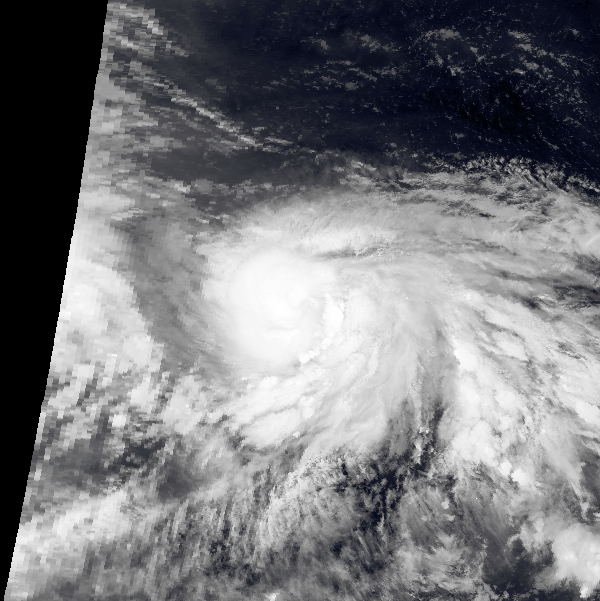
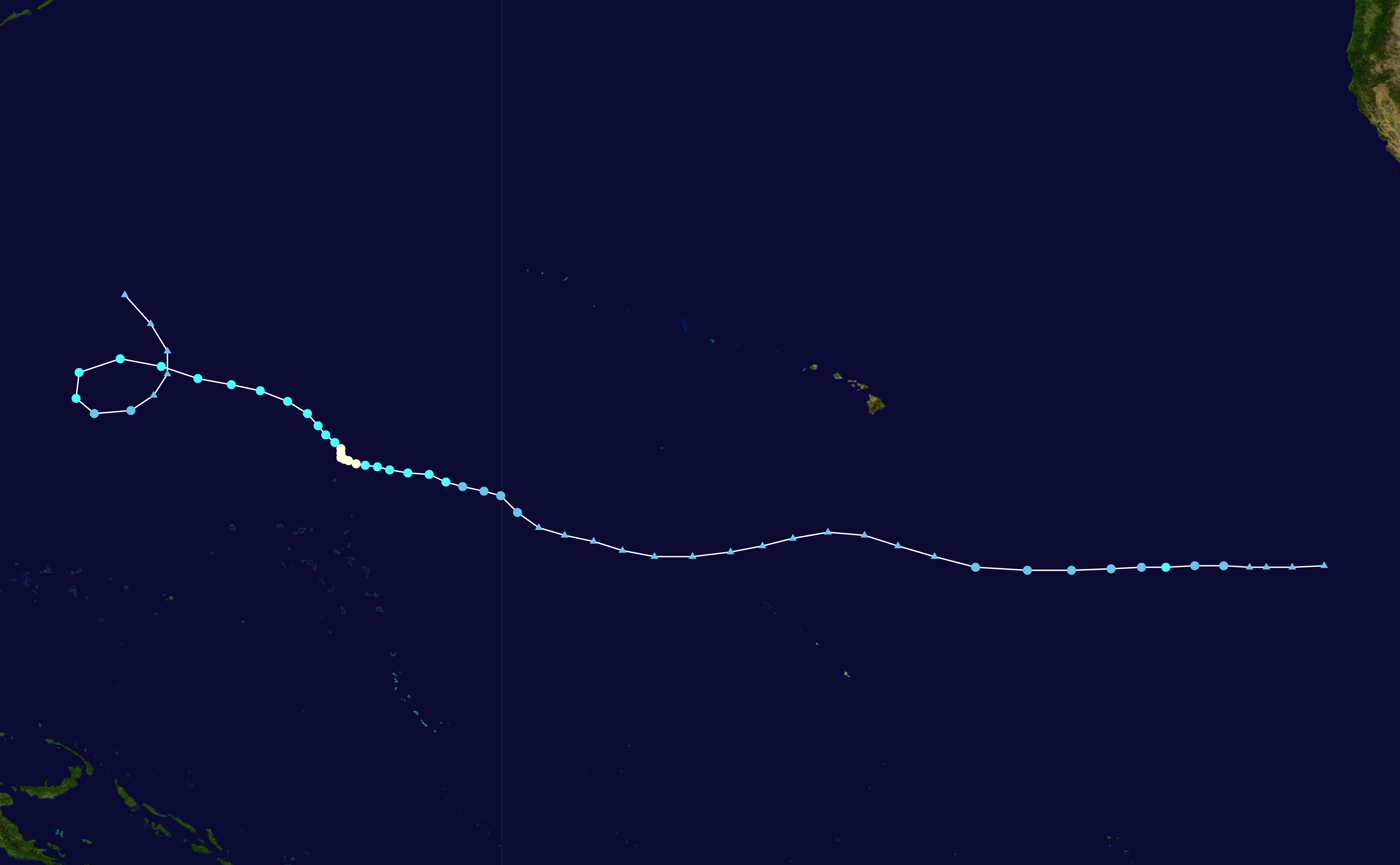
- Duration: August 8 (entered basin) – August 16
- Peak intensity: 110 km/h (70 mph) (10-min); 970 hPa (mbar)

From August 3 to August 4, Tropical Storm Georgette existed in the Eastern Pacific, but degraded into a tropical wave while moving rapidly westward. Five days later in the Western Pacific, Georgette regenerated into a tropical storm, and became a typhoon on August 10. At this time, a tropical disturbance was developing to its west, and it became Tropical Storm Tip on the 11th. Tip and Georgette underwent fujiwhara interaction, causing smaller Georgette to loop as the larger storm Tip headed to the north. Georgette weakened to a tropical depression on August 15, and was absorbed by Tip's large inflow band on August 16.

=== CMA Tropical Storm Fifteen ===
- Tropical storm (CMA)
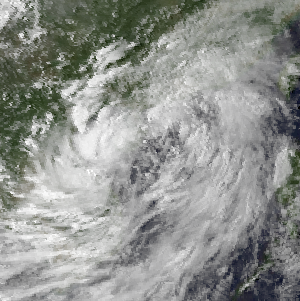
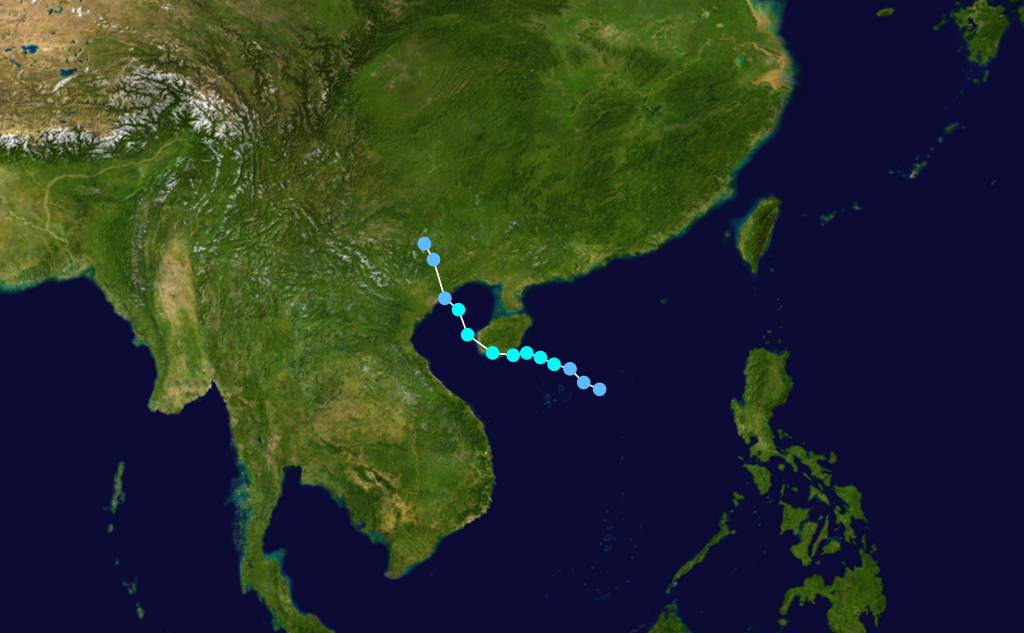
- Duration: August 9 – August 12
- Peak intensity: 70 km/h (45 mph) (10-min); 995 hPa (mbar)

This system formed in the South China Sea on August 9, and moved northwest through Hainan Island into mainland China, dissipating on August 12. In Hong Kong, winds gusted to 70 knots (130 km/h) at Tate's Cairn and Tai Mo Shan while Tai Po received 343 millimetres (13.5 in) of rainfall from the depression. Extensive flooding occurred on Hainan and western Guangdong Province, killing two people. The Hong Kong Royal Observatory considered this system a tropical depression.

=== Typhoon Tip ===
- Typhoon (JMA)
- Category 1 typhoon (SSHWS)
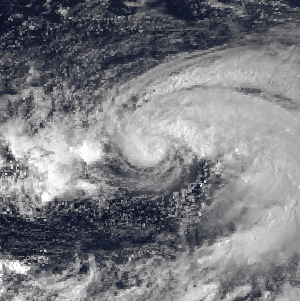
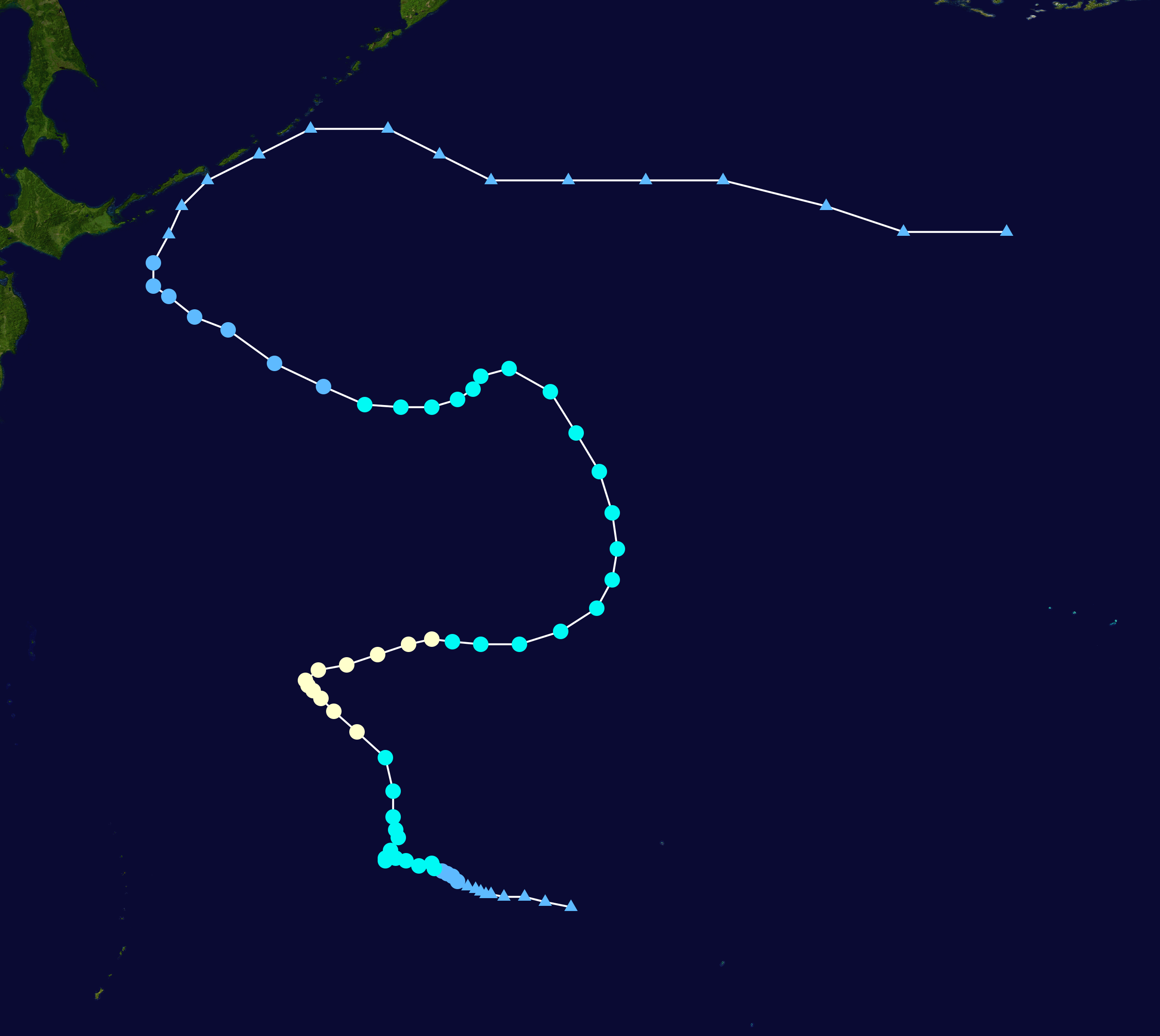
- Duration: August 13 – August 25
- Peak intensity: 130 km/h (80 mph) (10-min); 965 hPa (mbar)

Georgette became a typhoon on August 10 to the east of a tropical disturbance, which developed into Tropical Storm Tip on August 11. Tip and Georgette underwent the Fujiwhara effect, causing smaller Georgette to loop as the larger storm Tip headed to the north. Georgette became absorbed by Tip's large inflow band on August 16. Tip strengthened to a typhoon, and reached a peak intensity of 80 kn (150 km/h) winds before vertical wind shear caused the system to weaken. On August 19, Tip became extratropical, but the system persisted as a remnant extratropical low for six more days.

=== Typhoon Vera (Loleng) ===
- Very strong typhoon (JMA)
- Category 3 typhoon (SSHWS)
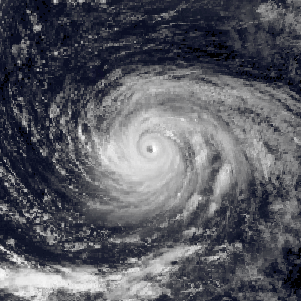
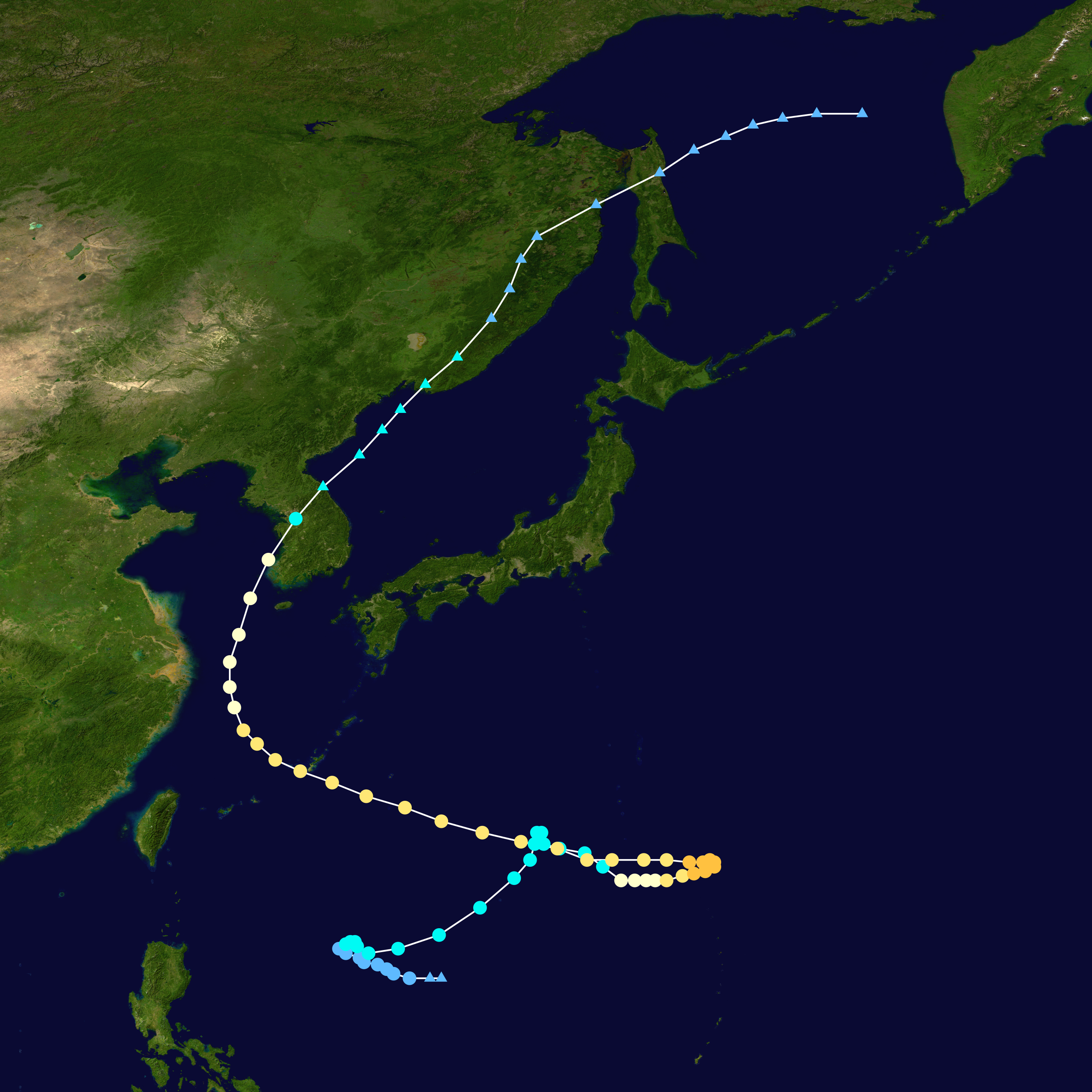
- Duration: August 15 – August 29
- Peak intensity: 165 km/h (105 mph) (10-min); 925 hPa (mbar)

The most intense and extensive monsoon trough since 1974 spawned a tropical depression on August 15. It drifted to the southeast, relocating several times in its formative stages. On August 16 it was upgraded to Tropical Storm Vera, and operationally the storm was to continue eastward, continuing to relocate in the broad monsoon trough and becoming a storm again on August 17 after weakening. Post-analysis by the Joint Typhoon Warning Center suggested that the first storm turned to the west and dissipated, and that a new, separate storm formed well to the east on August 17. However, the Japan Meteorological Agency maintained the system as a single storm.

Vera drifted northward until an upper-level ridge forced the storm to the east, providing upper-level outflow for Vera to strengthen to a typhoon on August 20. On August 22, Vera attained winds of 165 km/h (105 mph) before the weakening ridge forced the typhoon to the west, retracing its path it took days before. The typhoon slowly weakened, and hit Okinawa on August 25 as a 155 km/h (95 mph) typhoon. Vera turned to the northeast, hit South Korea on August 28 as a minimal typhoon, and became extratropical on August 29 in the Sea of Japan. A total of 23 people were killed from the storm, with moderate to heavy damage in its path as far north as the Soviet Far East. Damage totalled US$22 million (1986 dollars) across South Korea.

=== Typhoon Wayne (Miding) ===
- Typhoon (JMA)
- Category 2 typhoon (SSHWS)
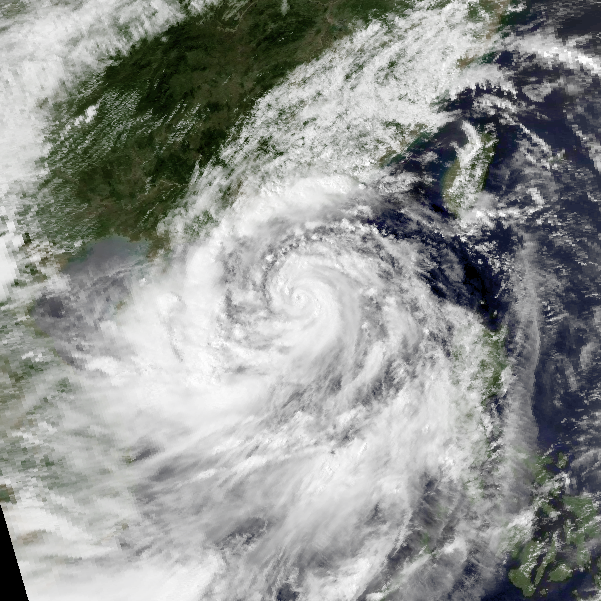
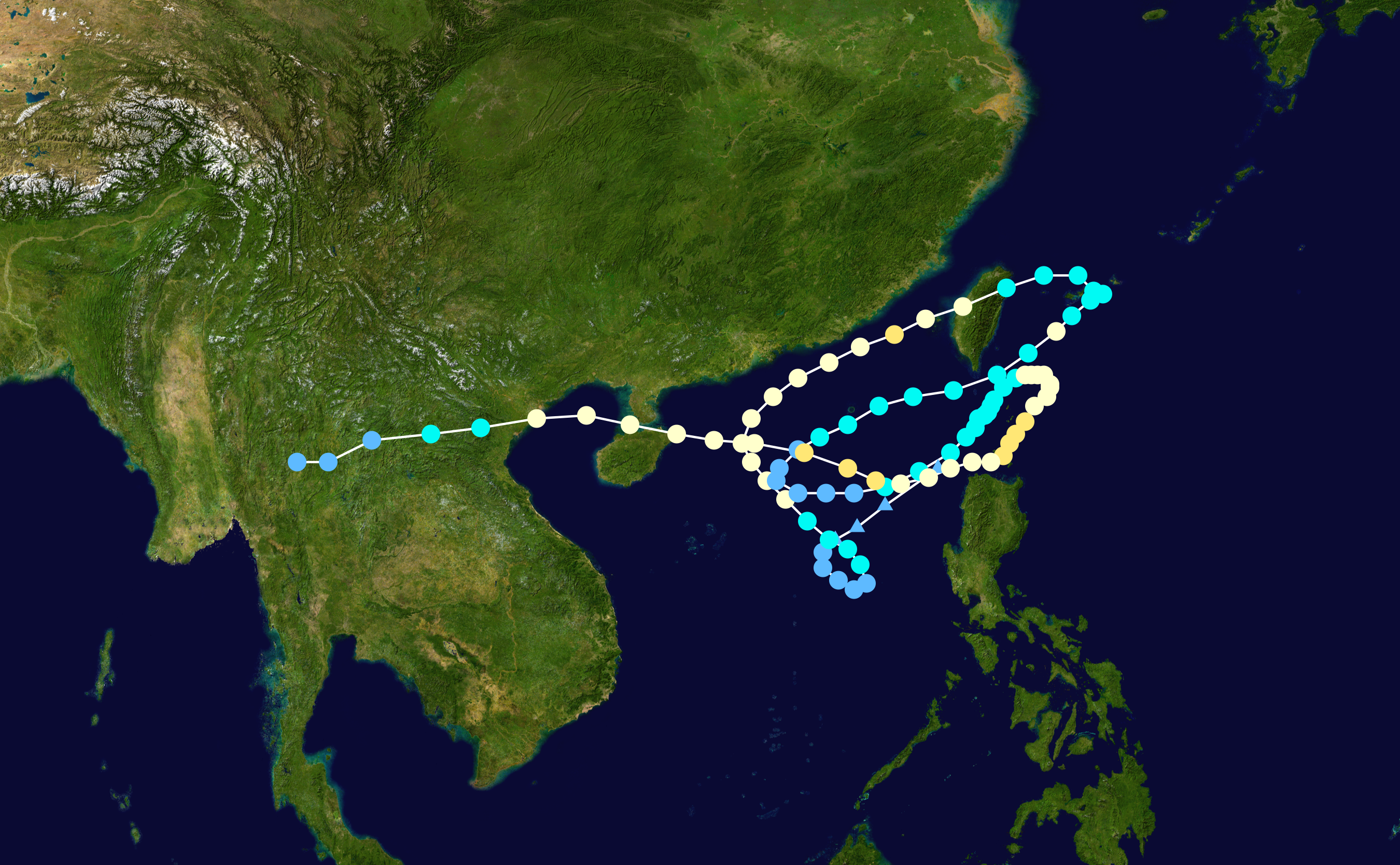
- Duration: August 16 – September 6
- Peak intensity: 140 km/h (85 mph) (10-min); 955 hPa (mbar)

One of the longest lasting Western Pacific system on record began its long life on August 16 in the South China Sea, having formed from the monsoon trough. It drifted to the southwest, then looped back to the northwest, becoming a tropical storm on August 18. Wayne turned to the northeast and became a typhoon on August 19. In Hong Kong, winds gusted to 78 knots (144 km/h) at Tate's Cairn. The typhoon passed offshore of southeastern China and hit western Taiwan on August 22. Wayne turned back to the south and southwest. Vertical shear caused Wayne to weaken to a depression on August 25. Wayne turned back to the northeast, rotating around Vera. Once Vera accelerated away, Wayne drifted northeastward through the South China Sea, becoming a tropical storm on August 27.

Wayne turned southward, becoming a typhoon again on August 30. Wayne passed close to northern Luzon on September 2 before turning back to the west. Two days later while moving quickly westward through the South China Sea, Wayne reached a peak of 85 knots (157 km/h) winds. During its various passages of Hong Kong, a total of 295 millimetres (11.6 in) of rainfall accumulated at Sai Kung. The cyclone hit northern Hainan on September 5, entered the Gulf of Tonkin, and made its final landfall on northern Vietnam later that day as a 60 knots (110 km/h) tropical storm. The next day, Wayne dissipated over Vietnam, after 85 advisories and being the longest lasting Western Pacific system in history. Wayne brought torrential rains through its path to the Philippines, Taiwan, southeastern China, Hainan Island, and Vietnam. Because of this, 490 fatalities (most in Vietnam), tens of thousands left homeless, and US$399 million (1986 dollars) in damage can be attributed to Typhoon Wayne.

=== Tropical Storm Fifteen ===
- Tropical storm (JMA)
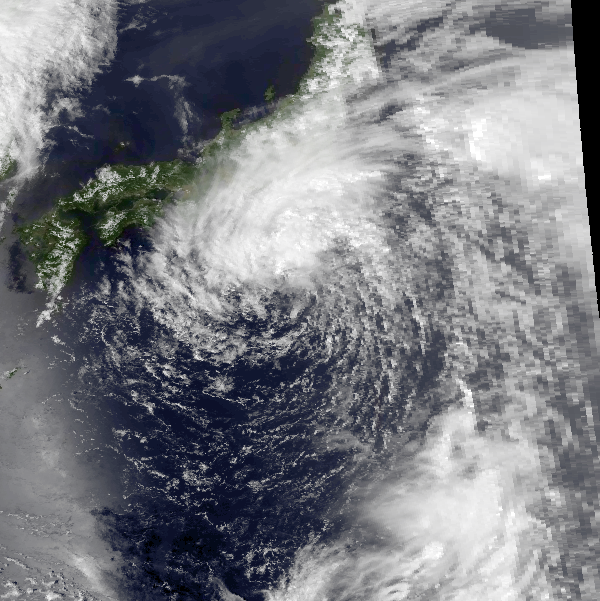
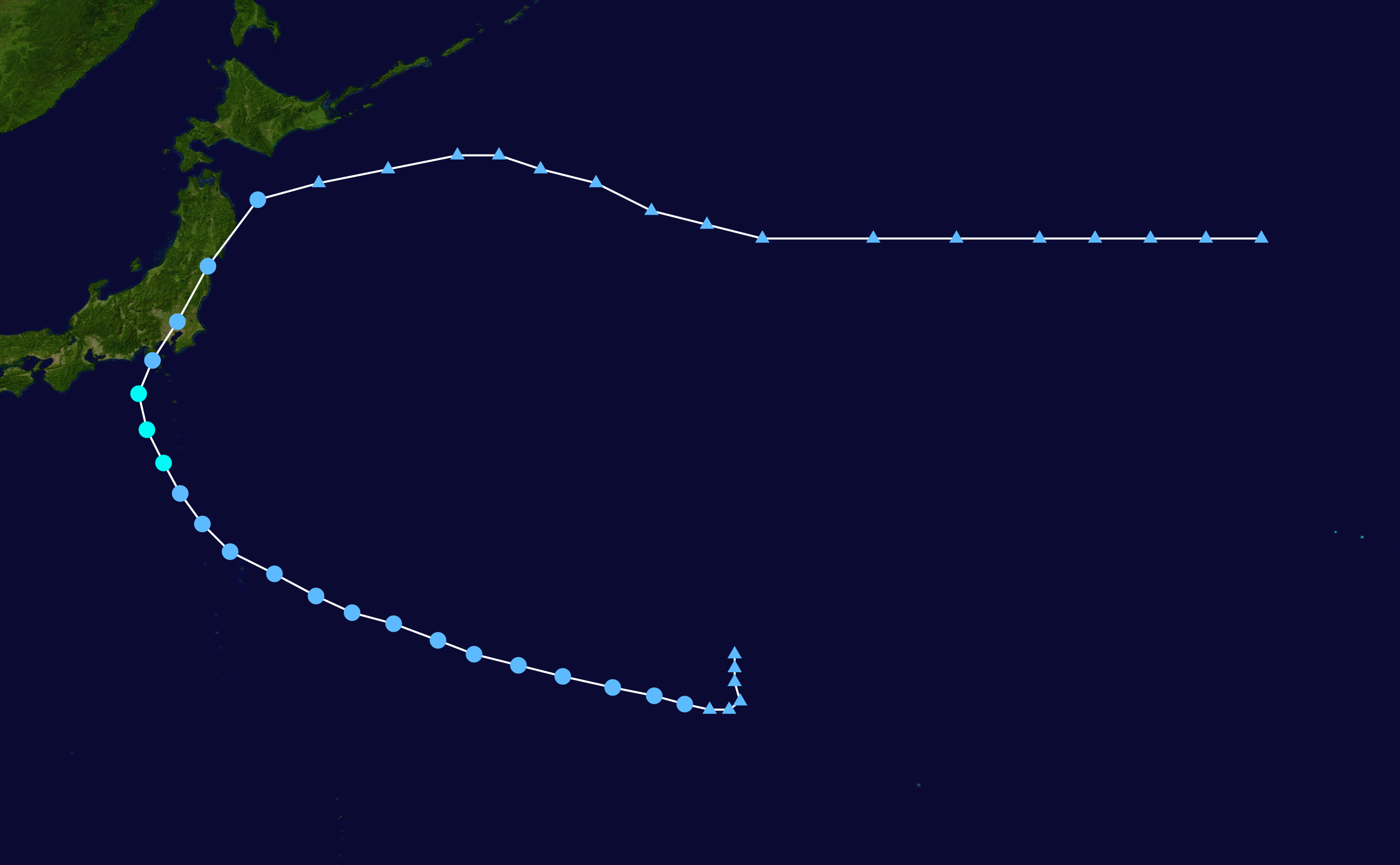
- Duration: August 28 – September 4
- Peak intensity: 65 km/h (40 mph) (10-min); 992 hPa (mbar)

Originating in the subtropical west-central Pacific, this large cyclone moved westward to a point south of Japan before becoming a tropical storm. Soon afterward, the system recurved across central Japan on September 2 and evolved into an extratropical cyclone as it returned to the northern Pacific Ocean on September 3. This system was recognized by the Japanese Meteorological Agency as a tropical storm, and the Hong Kong Royal Observatory as a tropical depression.

=== Typhoon Abby (Norming) ===
- Very strong typhoon (JMA)
- Category 2 typhoon (SSHWS)
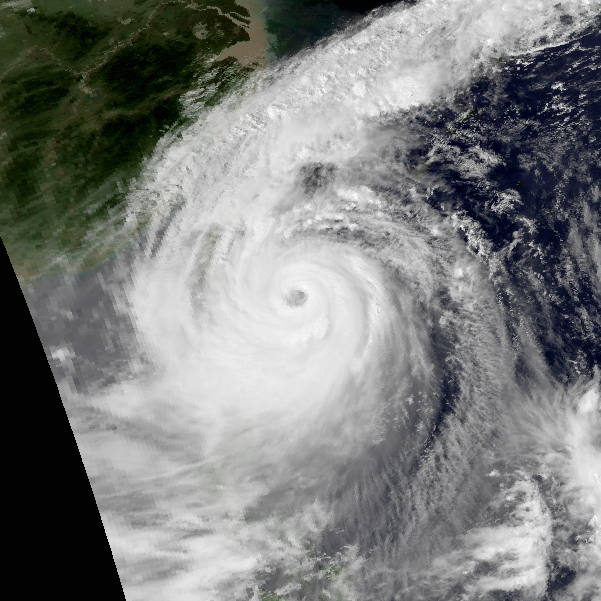
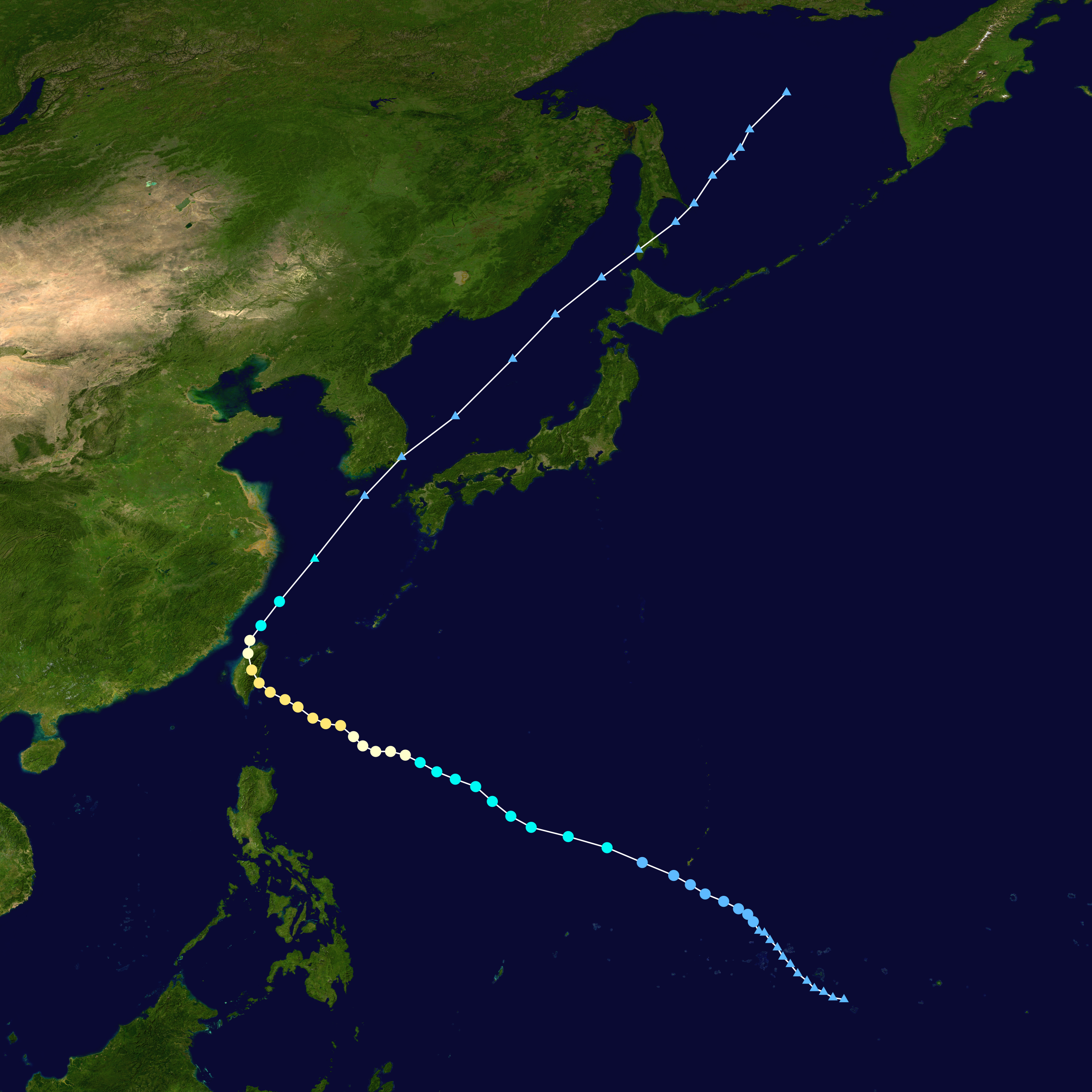
- Duration: September 13 – September 20
- Peak intensity: 155 km/h (100 mph) (10-min); 945 hPa (mbar)

Typhoon Abby developed from an area of persistent convection to the southwest of Truk in early August. A tropical depression formed on August 13 to the southeast of Guam and was upgraded to a tropical storm a day after passing south of the island. Abby then steadily intensified to a peak of 95 kn (176 km/h) but weakened before striking Taiwan. Typhoon Abby lashed the island with winds of 85 kn (157 km/h) and heavy rains. Flooding on Taiwan killed 13 people, and agricultural damage totalled $81 million (1986 USD, $173 million 2013 USD). After departing Taiwan Abby continued north-northeast before dissipating in the East China Sea.

=== Typhoon Ben ===
- Very strong typhoon (JMA)
- Category 4 typhoon (SSHWS)
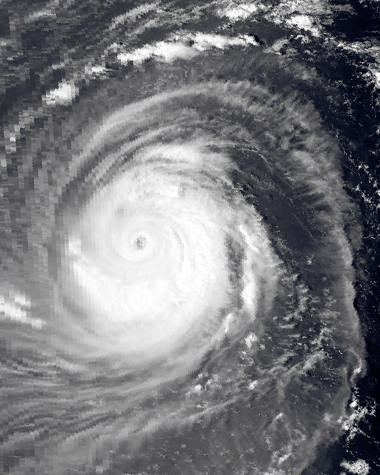
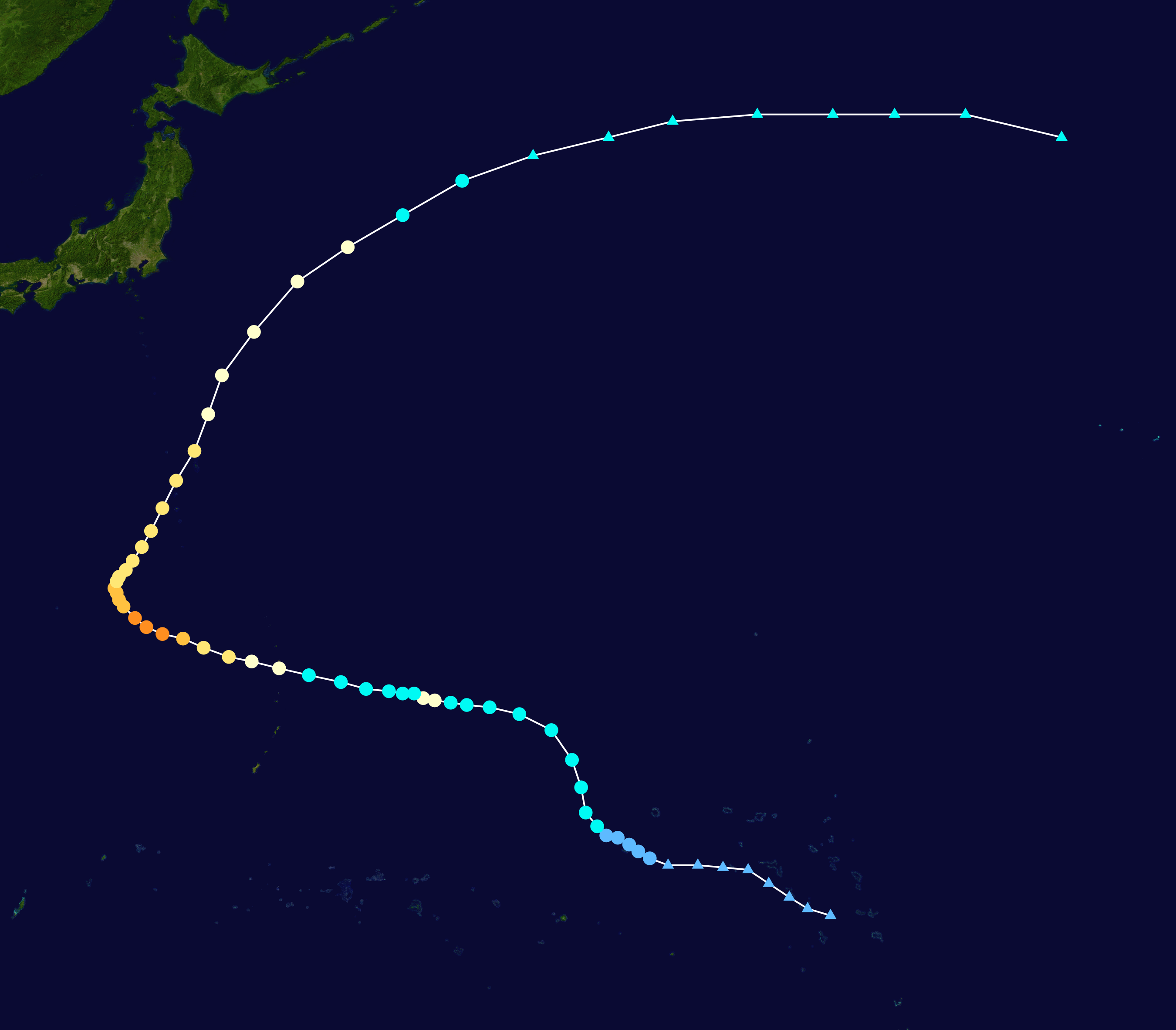
- Duration: September 19 – September 30
- Peak intensity: 185 km/h (115 mph) (10-min); 920 hPa (mbar)

The initial tropical disturbance formed near Majuro on September 15. The system moved west-northwest, becoming a tropical depression on September 18 and a tropical storm on September 19. Thirteen perished on a fishing vessel passing by Pagan as Ben passed nearby. Ben turned north-northwest for a day and a half, moving around an upper level cyclone in its vicinity, before resuming a west-northwest track on September 20. Vertical wind shear, caused by strong north-northeast winds aloft, weakened Ben to minimal tropical storm intensity by September 21. Ben entered a more favourable environment, achieving typhoon intensity on September 23 before rounding the southwest portion of the subtropical ridge. Ben recurved to the northeast on September 26, moving well to the east of Japan, as vertical wind shear increased due to strengthening winds aloft from the southwest. Ben subsequently weakened back into a tropical storm on September 30 before transitioning into an extratropical cyclone later that day.

=== Typhoon Carmen ===
- Very strong typhoon (JMA)
- Category 3 typhoon (SSHWS)
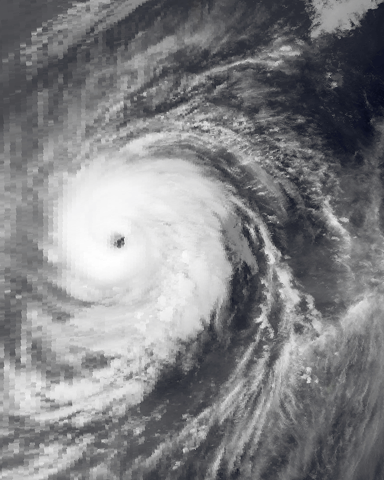
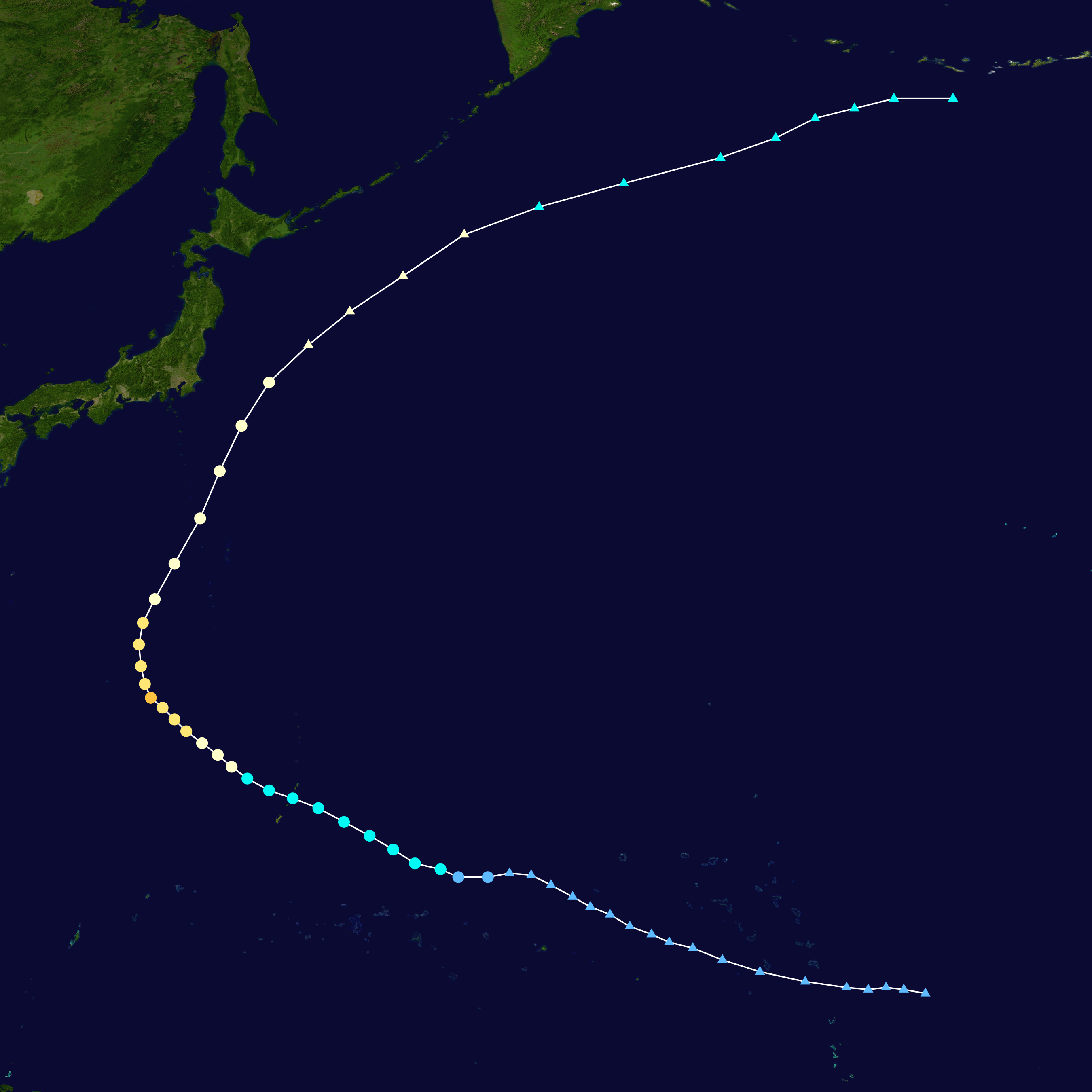
- Duration: October 2 – October 8
- Peak intensity: 155 km/h (100 mph) (10-min); 938 hPa (mbar)

The initial tropical disturbance was first noted to the east-southeast of Majuro on September 27. The system tracked north of due west, before consolidating slowly into a tropical depression on September 30 and a tropical storm on October 2. After passing between Rota and Saipan, Carmen turned northwest and intensified into a typhoon on October 4. Winds at Rota peaked at 53 knots (98 km/h) as it passed by the island. Heavy rains fell at Guam, where amounts totalled between 254 and 279 millimetres (10.0 and 11.0 in). Moving through a break in the subtropical ridge, Carmen rapidly strengthened as it turned north, then northeast, on October 6 when maximum sustained winds reached 100 knots (190 km/h). As vertical wind shear increased due to strengthening southwest winds aloft, the cyclone weakened into a tropical storm on October 8, evolving into an extratropical cyclone by October 9.

=== Tropical Storm Dom (Oyang) ===
- Tropical storm (JMA)
- Tropical storm (SSHWS)
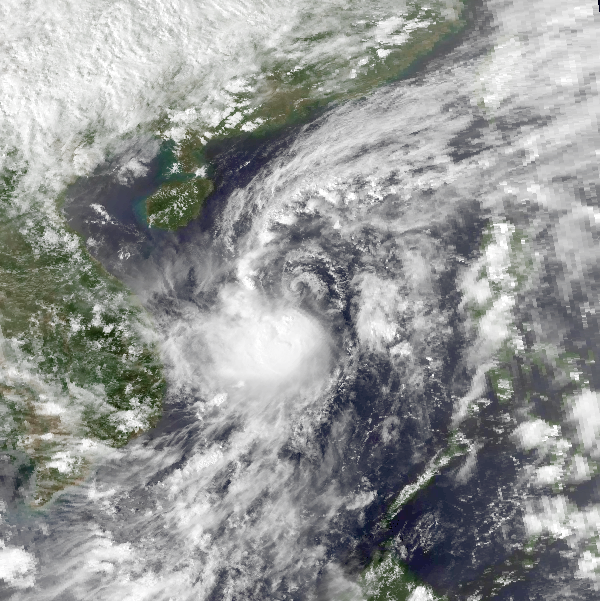
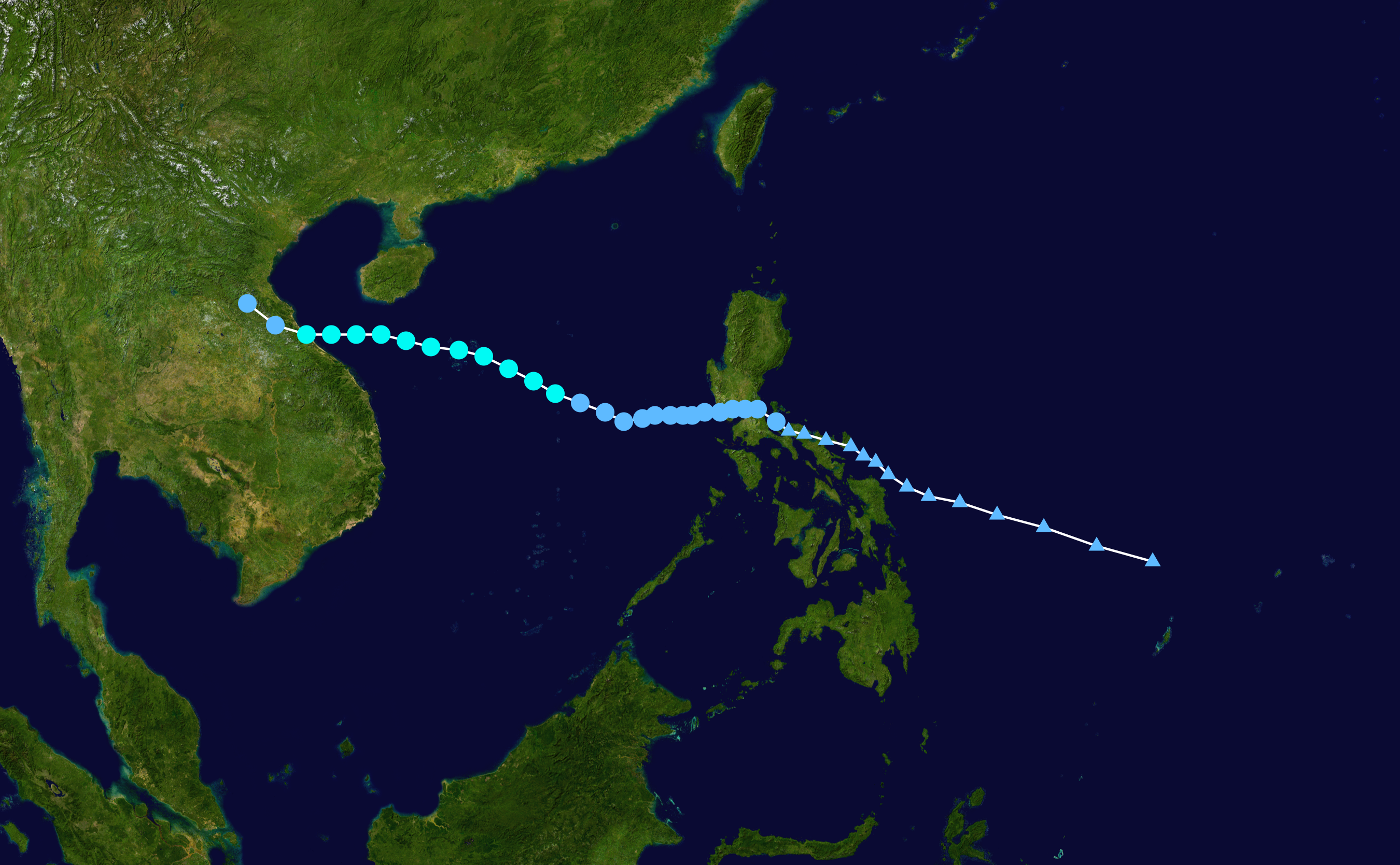
- Duration: October 9 – October 12
- Peak intensity: 75 km/h (45 mph) (10-min); 995 hPa (mbar)

Initially noted as a tropical disturbance in the Philippine Sea on October 2, the system moved slowly west-northwest to the south of the subtropical ridge, becoming a tropical depression on October 4. Crossing the Philippines, the depression caused heavy rainfall and flooding as it emerged into the South China Sea and developed into a tropical storm on October 9. Development was slow due to strong upper-level winds from the northeast displacing thunderstorms west-southwest of its center. Continuing to track north of due west, Dom made landfall in Vietnam and dissipated as it moved along the Laos/Vietnam border on October 12. A total of 16 perished and damage totalled US$4 million (1986 dollars) in Luzon.

=== Typhoon Ellen (Pasing) ===
- Typhoon (JMA)
- Category 1 typhoon (SSHWS)
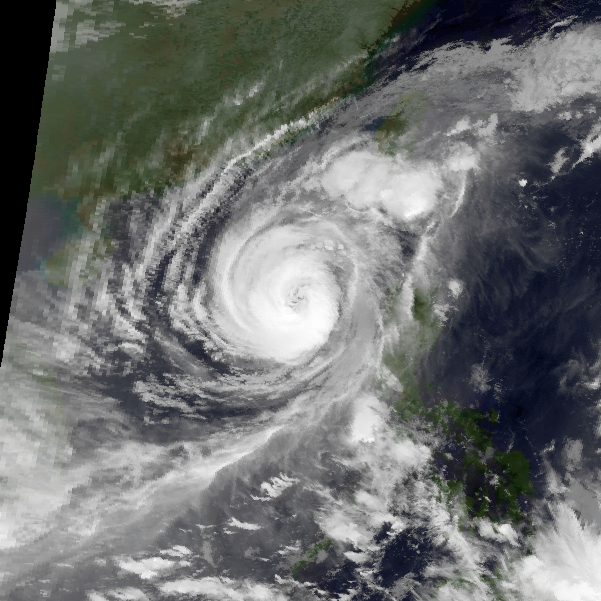
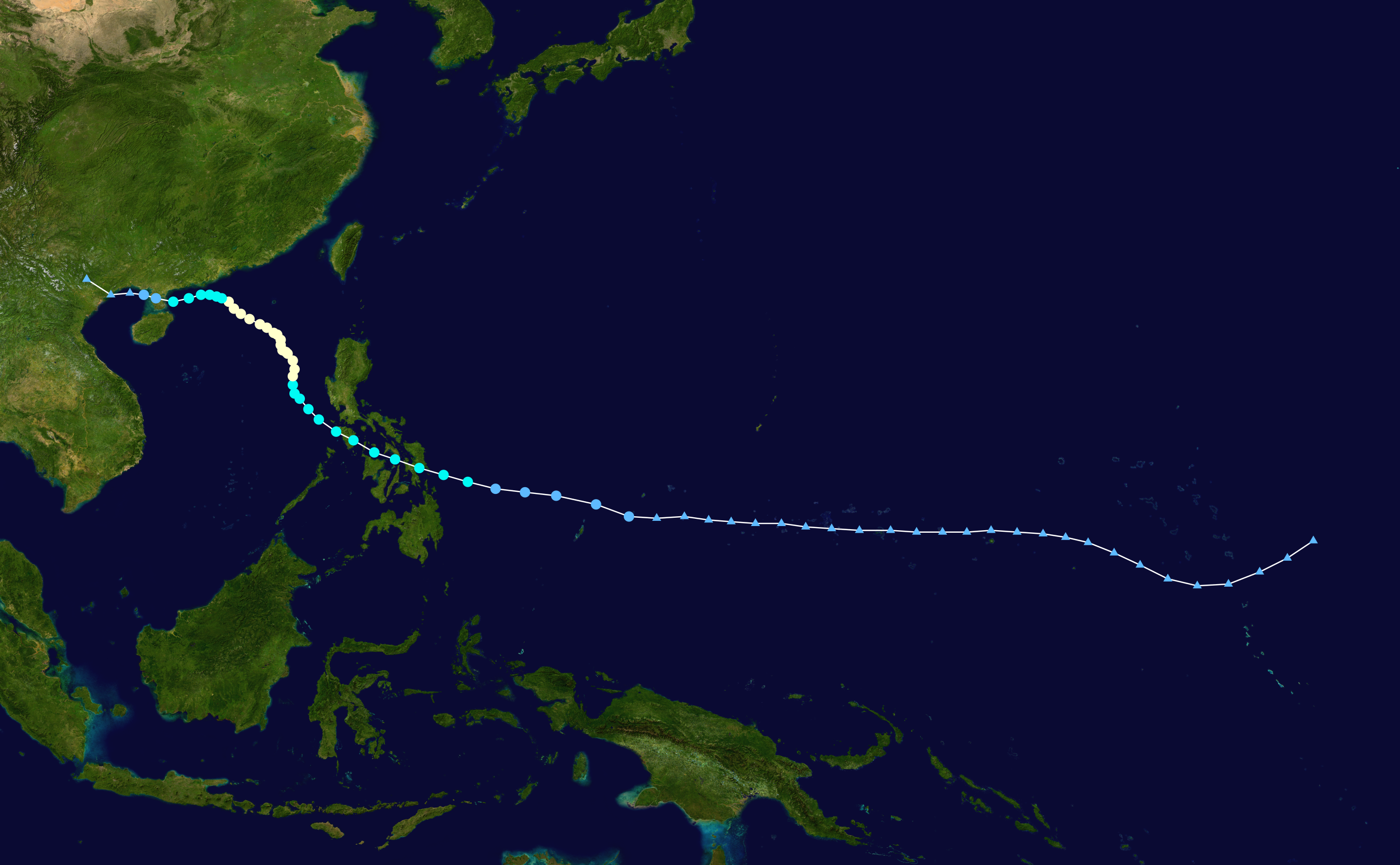
- Duration: October 11 – October 19
- Peak intensity: 130 km/h (80 mph) (10-min); 965 hPa (mbar)

The initial tropical disturbance formed just west of the International Date Line within the monsoon trough on October 3. The system moved westward for nearly a week without significant development. Becoming a tropical depression on October 9 and a tropical storm on October 11, the cyclone turned to the west-northwest, moving through the central Philippines into the South China Sea. Turning more northerly, Ellen intensified to a typhoon while paralleling the west coast of Luzon on October 14. By October 15, Ellen's track became increasingly more westerly due to a building surface high pressure area to its north. Weakening began due to westerly winds aloft and land interaction with China, and Ellen dropped back to tropical storm strength on October 17. The cyclone moved south of Hong Kong and north of Hainan Island into mainland China on October 19. In Hong Kong, winds gusted to 78 knots (144 km/h) at Tai Mo Shan. As it neared the border between Vietnam and China, Ellen dissipated on October 20.

=== Typhoon Forrest ===
- Very strong typhoon (JMA)
- Category 3 typhoon (SSHWS)
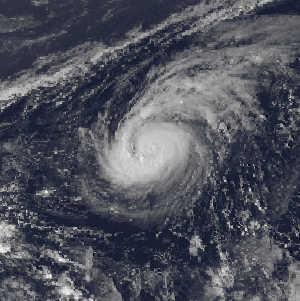
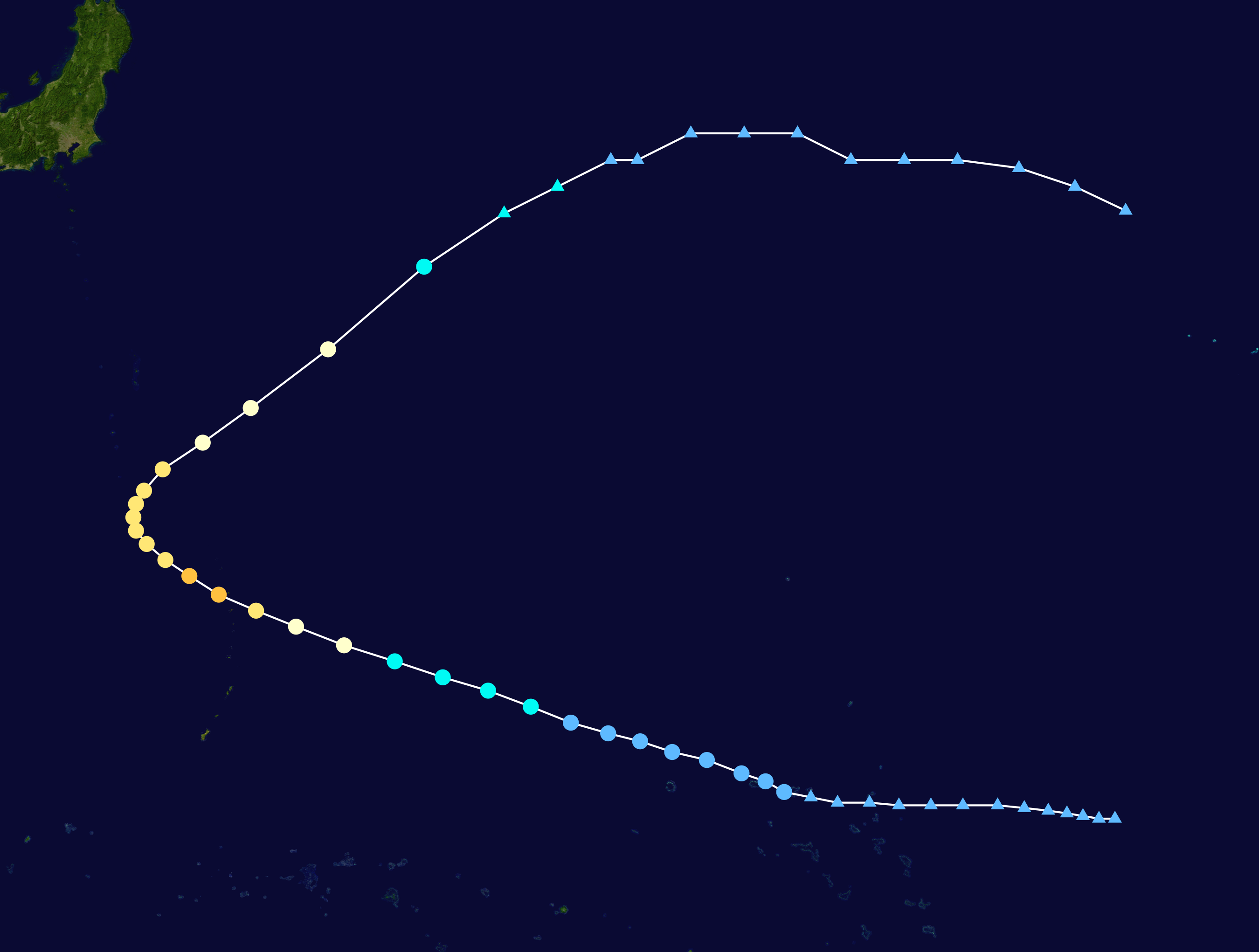
- Duration: October 15 – October 20
- Peak intensity: 165 km/h (105 mph) (10-min); 930 hPa (mbar)

The initial tropical disturbance formed near the International Date Line on October 10 before moving on a parabolic track well east of Asia. A small system, it moved west-northwest and organized into a tropical depression on October 15, then a tropical storm later in the day. Late on October 16, Forrest intensified into a typhoon. The next day, the typhoon reached its peak intensity of 100 knots (190 km/h) and passed near the island of Agrihan where one building was left standing and communications were eliminated. Forrest then recurved south-southeast of Iwo Jima. As winds aloft increased out of the west, Forrest slowly weakened, becoming a tropical storm once more on October 20 and evolving into an extratropical cyclone by October 21.

=== Tropical Storm Georgia (Ruping) ===
- Tropical storm (JMA)
- Tropical storm (SSHWS)
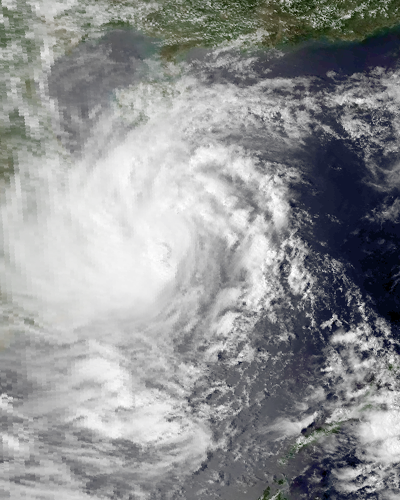
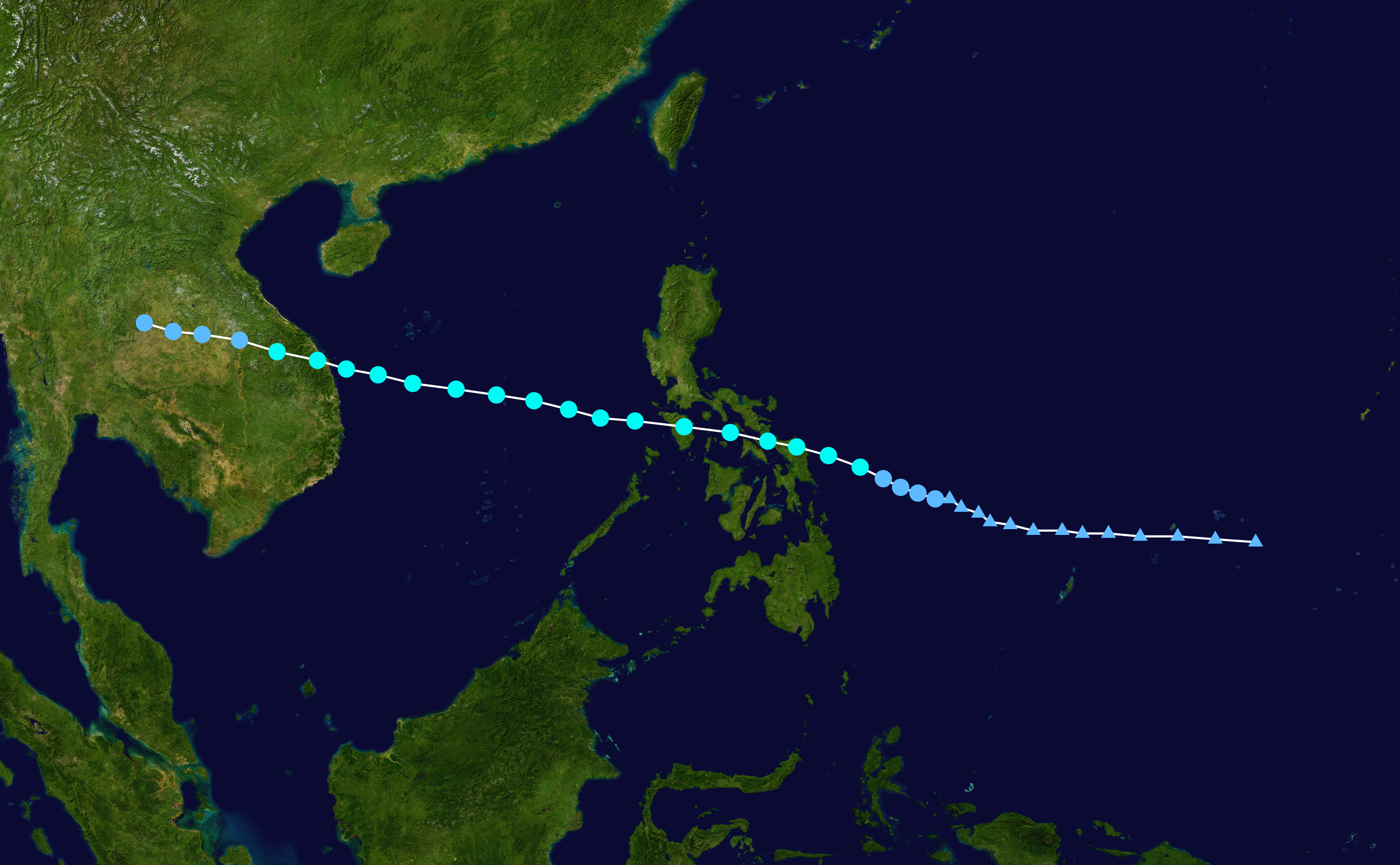
- Duration: October 18 – October 23
- Peak intensity: 85 km/h (50 mph) (10-min); 985 hPa (mbar)

First noted as a tropical disturbance east of Ulithi within the monsoon trough on October 14, the system moved north of due west. Slowly developing, the system evolved into a tropical depression on October 17 and tropical storm on October 18. The cyclone reached its peak intensity before it crossed the central Philippines on October 19 and emerged into the South China Sea. On October 22, Georgia made landfall across Vietnam and crossed Laos into Thailand. The system subsequently dissipated by October 23.

=== Tropical Depression Susang ===
- Tropical depression (PAGASA)
- Duration: October 30 – November 1
- Peak intensity: 45 km/h (30 mph) (10-min); 1005 hPa (mbar)

=== Severe Tropical Storm Herbert (Tering) ===
- Severe tropical storm (JMA)
- Tropical storm (SSHWS)
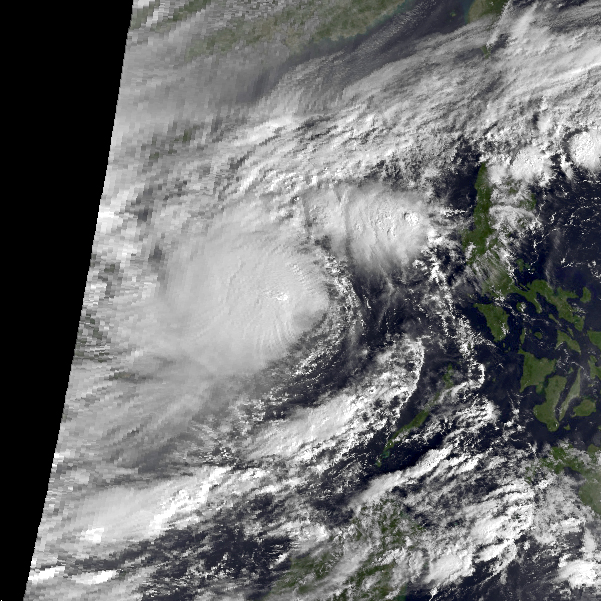
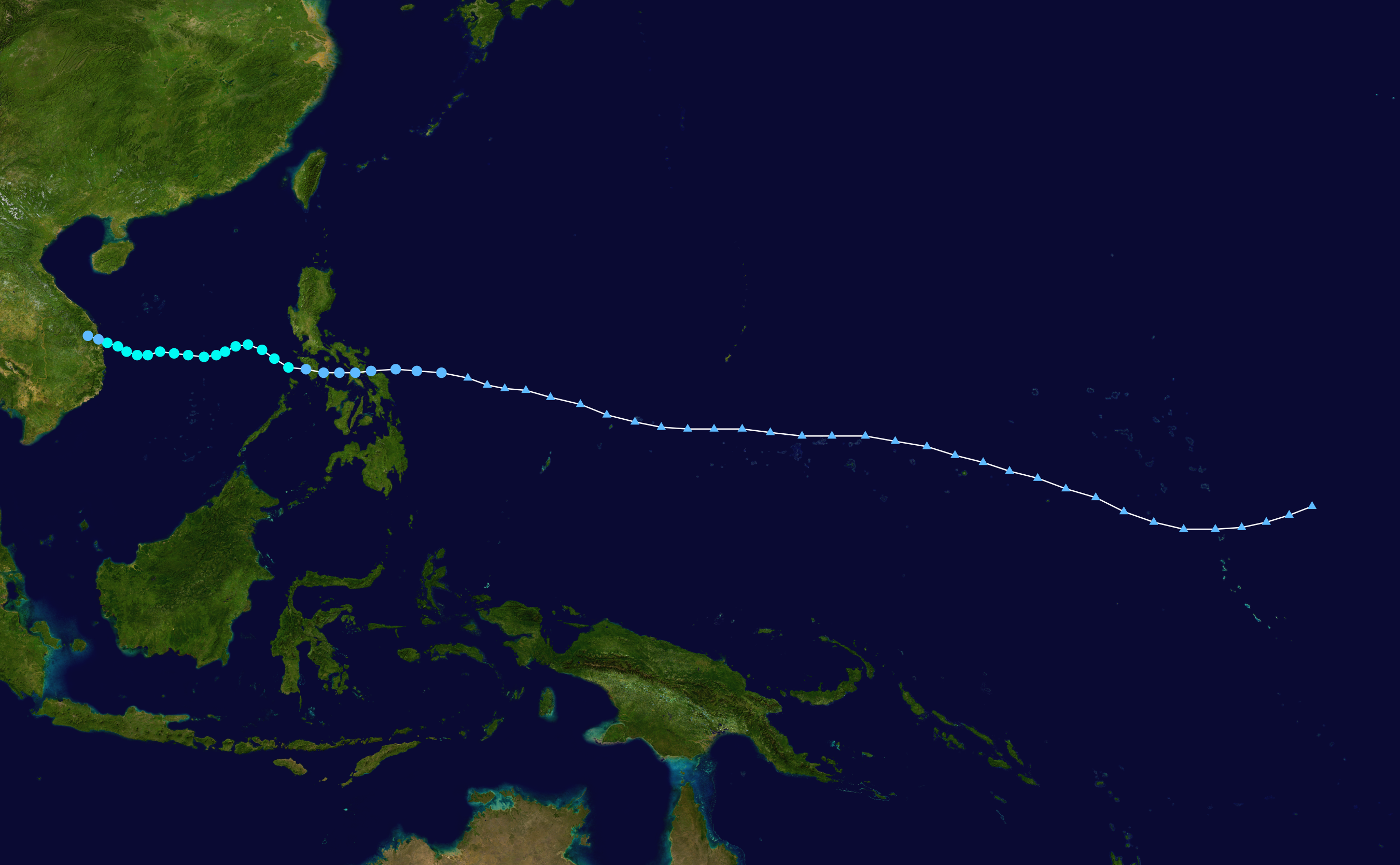
- Duration: November 7 – November 11
- Peak intensity: 110 km/h (70 mph) (10-min); 985 hPa (mbar)

Forming as a tropical disturbance near the International Date Line on October 29, the system moved westward at low latitude eventually organizing into a tropical depression on November 3 south of Guam. The system moved north of due west across the central Philippines and emerged into the South China Sea before strengthening into a tropical storm on November 9. Herbert moved westward, making landfall in Vietnam on November 11 before dissipating in Laos on November 12.

=== Severe Tropical Storm Ida (Uding) ===
- Severe tropical storm (JMA)
- Tropical storm (SSHWS)
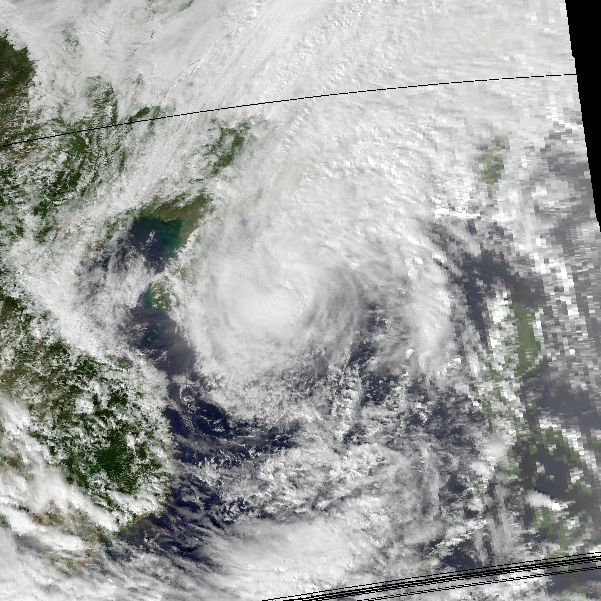
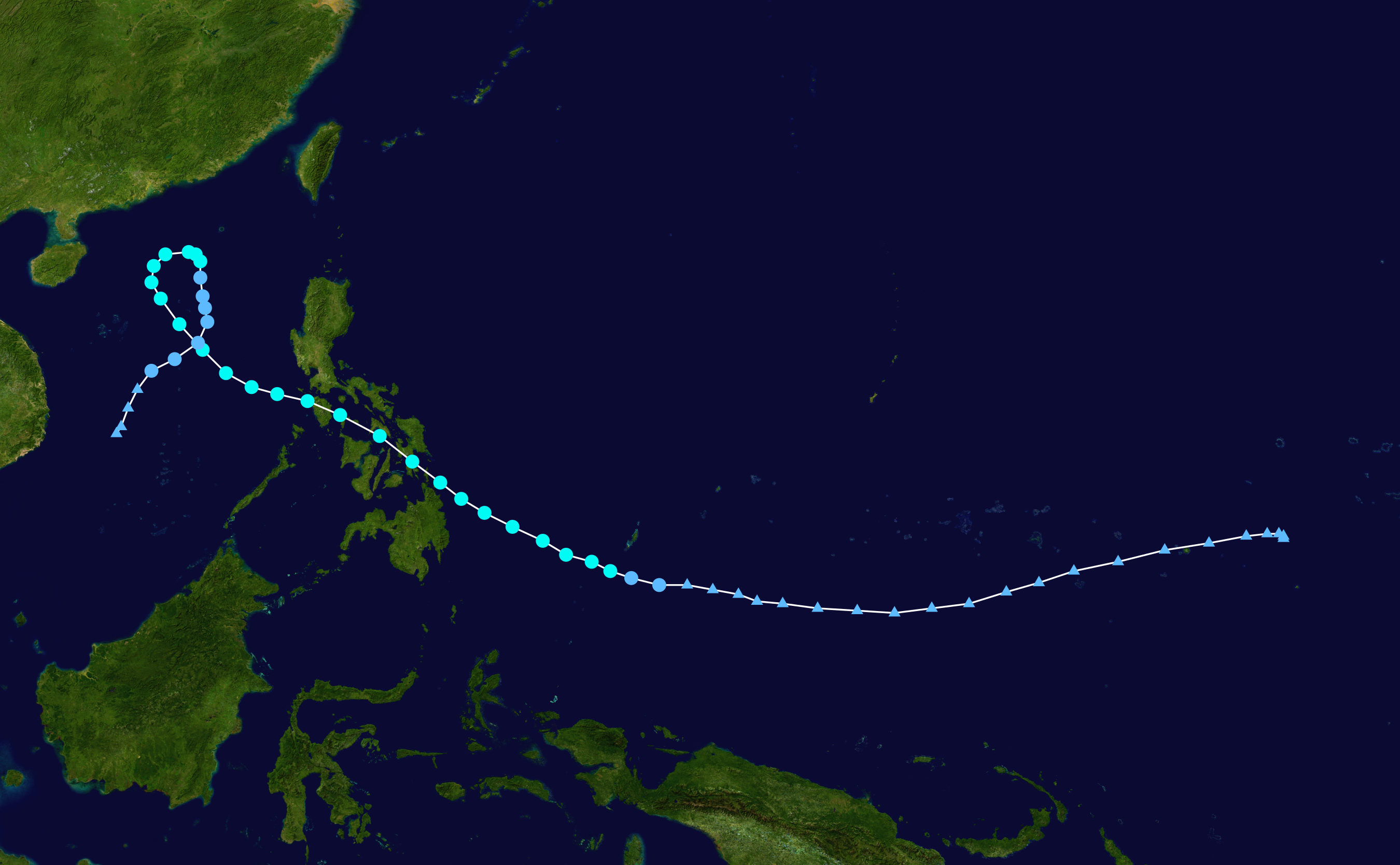
- Duration: November 10 – November 16
- Peak intensity: 95 km/h (60 mph) (10-min); 985 hPa (mbar)

Initially a tropical disturbance between Kosrae and Enewetak on November 6, the system moved south of west until November 9, when the system began tracking north of west. The system organized into a tropical depression on November 10, then tropical storm on November 11, while moving towards the Philippines. Six days after Herbert, Ida crossed the central portion of the archipelago between November 12 and 13. Interaction with the islands weakened the system back into a tropical depression before emerging into the South China Sea. Strengthening back into a tropical storm on November 14, Ida transcribed an anticyclonic, or clockwise, loop, weakening back into a tropical depression on November 16 while moving to the south due to strong southwest winds aloft. The depression moved south-southwest before dissipating on November 19. Two died when a cargo ship sank near Dongsha.

=== Typhoon Joe (Weling) ===
- Very strong typhoon (JMA)
- Category 3 typhoon (SSHWS)
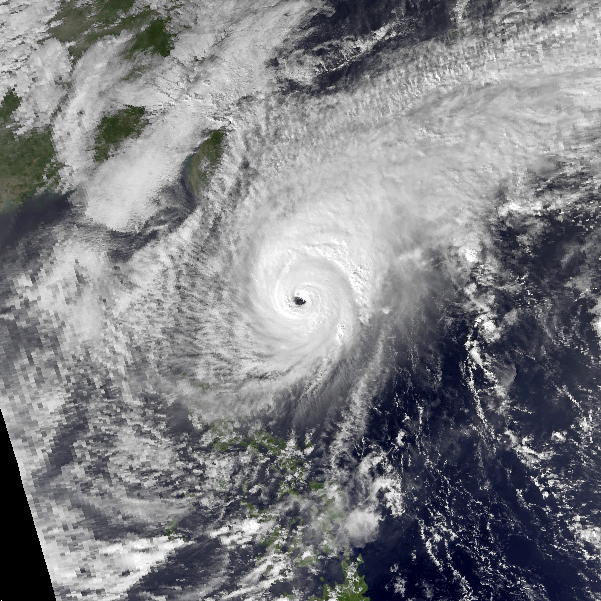
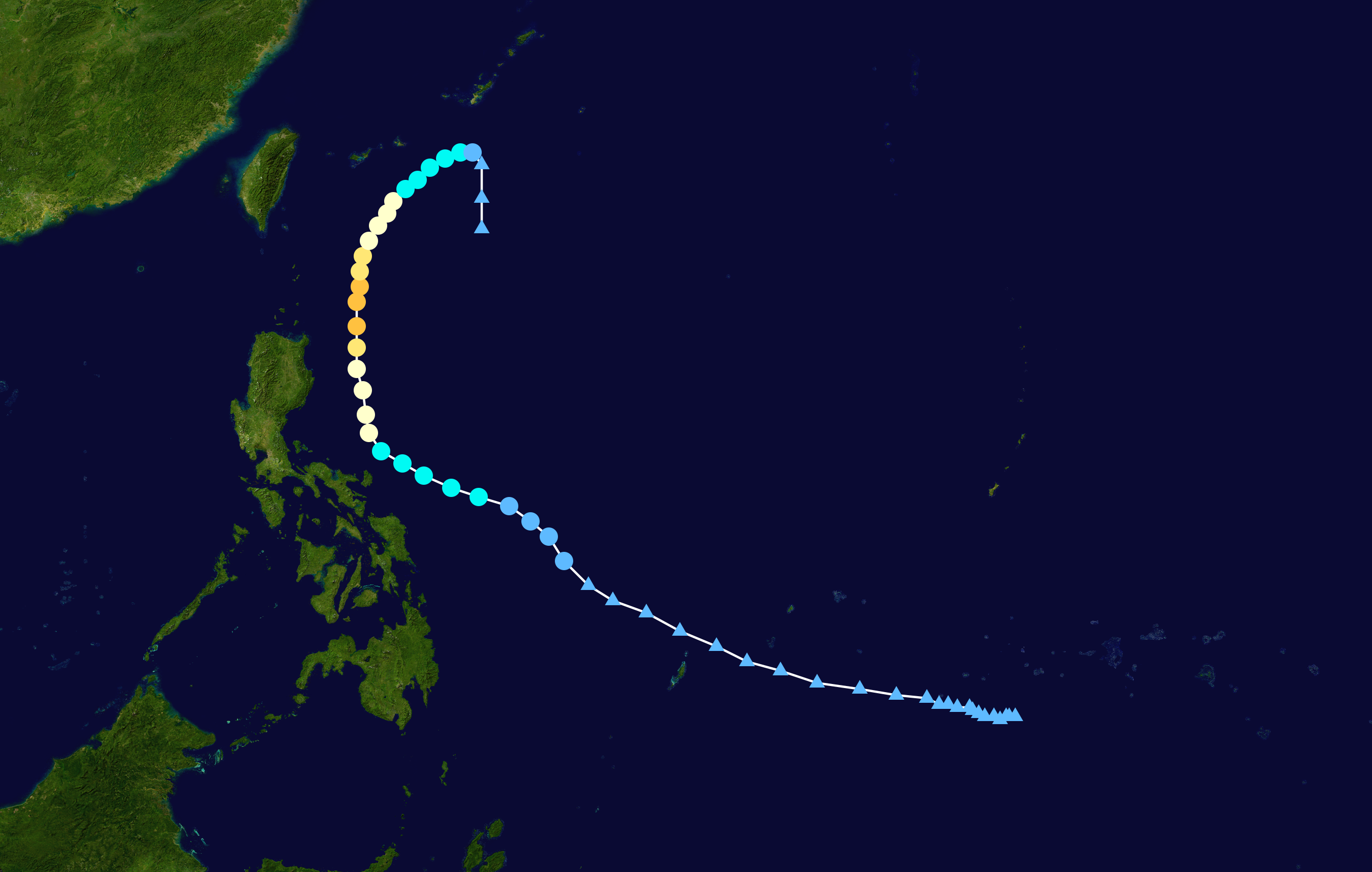
- Duration: November 18 – November 25
- Peak intensity: 155 km/h (100 mph) (10-min); 940 hPa (mbar)

The initial tropical disturbance formed on November 12 south of Guam. Moving west-northwest, the system organized into a tropical depression in the Philippine Sea on November 17, and then a tropical storm on November 20. Joe recurved just east of the Philippines due to a weakness in the subtropical ridge, strengthening into a typhoon on November 20. East of Taiwan, Joe weakened back into a tropical storm due to strong southwest winds aloft on November 23 and then a tropical depression on November 24. Turning southeast, the remaining low level circulation continued weakening, dissipating on November 25.

=== Tropical Depression ===
- Tropical depression (HKO)
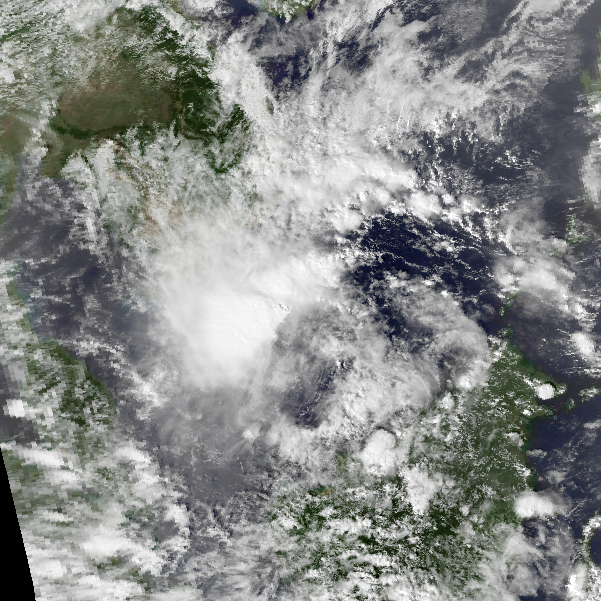
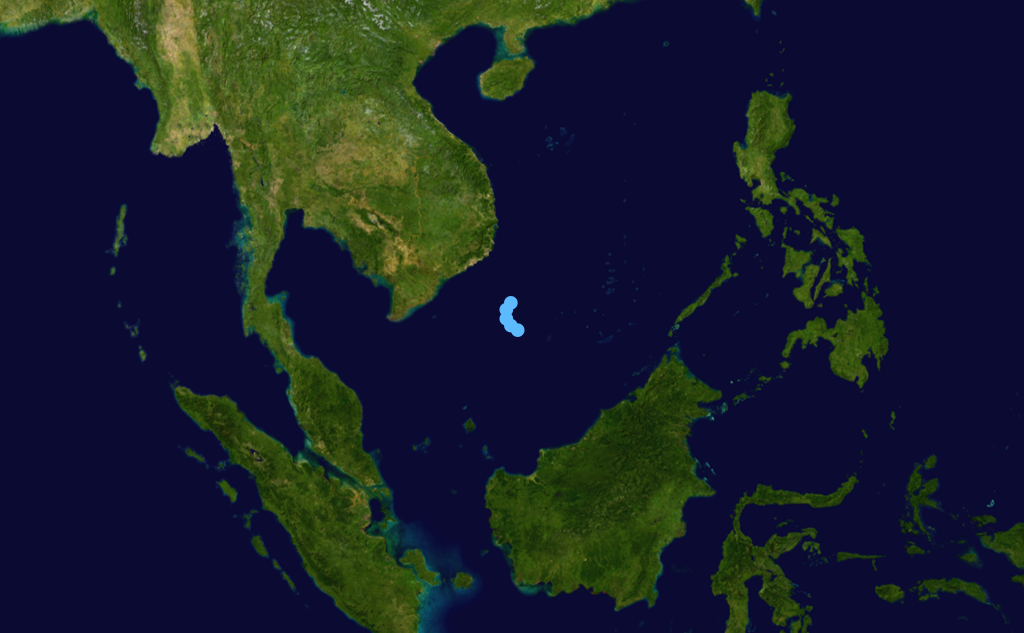
- Duration: November 21 – November 26
- Peak intensity: 55 km/h (35 mph) (10-min); 1004 hPa (mbar)

A tropical depression formed in the southern South China Sea on November 24, dissipating the following day without making landfall on any neighbouring land mass. This depression was acknowledged by the Hong Kong Royal Observatory in their year end summary.

=== Typhoon Kim (Yaning) ===
- Violent typhoon (JMA)
- Category 4 super typhoon (SSHWS)
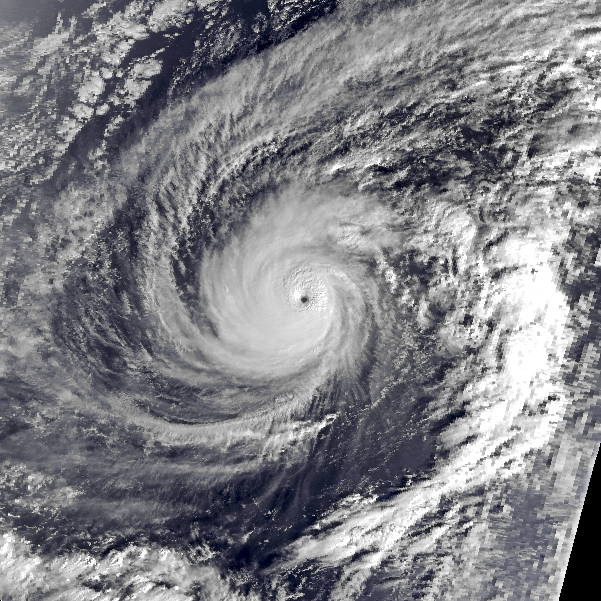
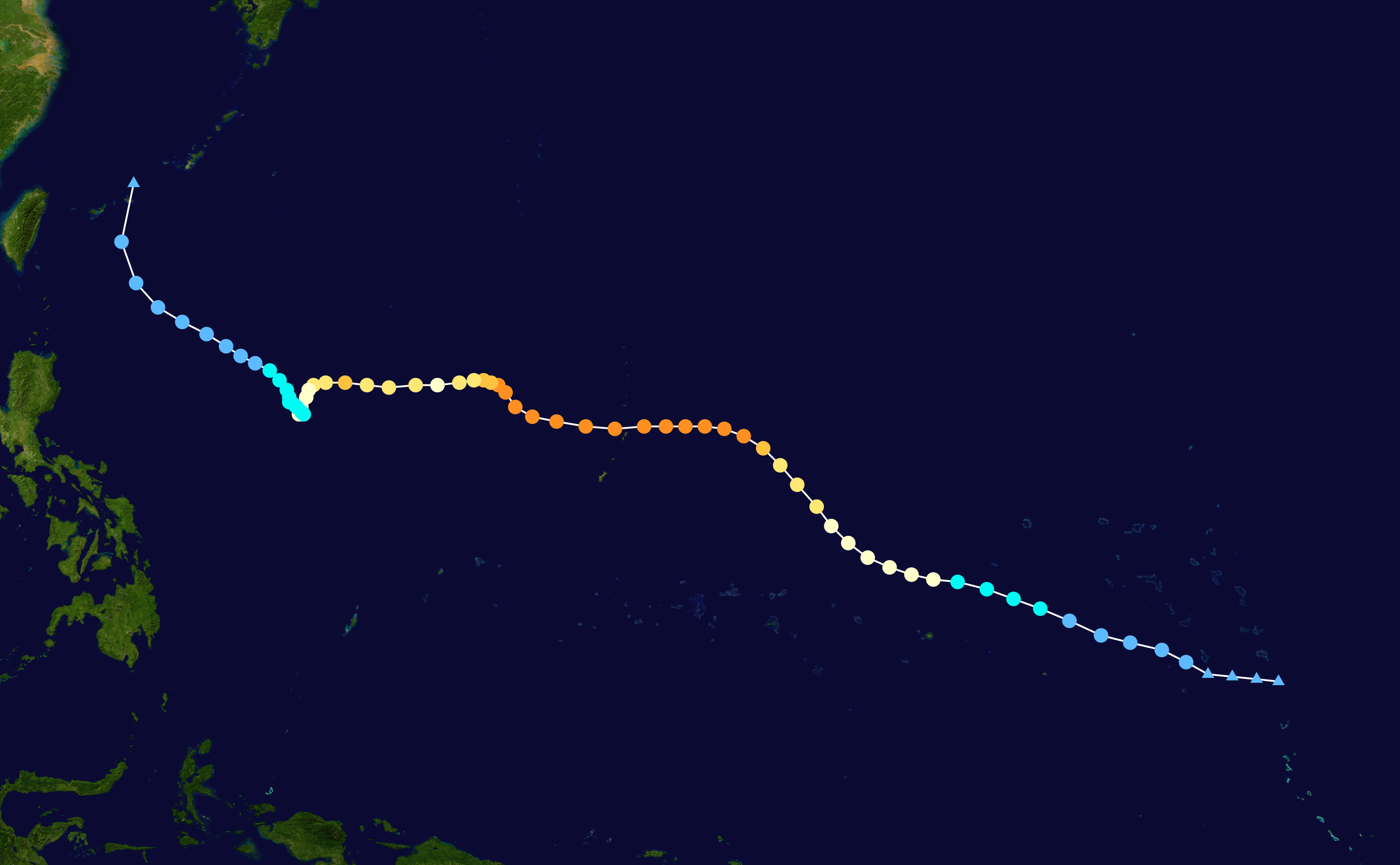
- Duration: November 28 – December 13
- Peak intensity: 205 km/h (125 mph) (10-min); 905 hPa (mbar)

The initial tropical disturbance formed south of Majuro on November 27. The small system developed quickly, becoming a tropical depression later that day, a tropical storm on November 28, and a typhoon on November 29. Kim turned northwest later the day due to a weakness in the subtropical ridge, before a strengthening high pressure system to its north forced a more westerly track by December 2, with Kim becoming a super typhoon soon afterward. The cyclone moved just north of Saipan, knocking out all electricity and water. Damage on the island totalled US$15 million (1986 dollars). Retaining super typhoon intensity into December 3, the system weakened and turned northwest on December 4 due to another weakness in the subtropical ridge. The high pressure system to its north restrengthened, turning Kim back to the west on December 5. On December 8, Kim made a cyclonic, or counter clockwise, loop due to a strong surface high building to its north, which was completed on December 11. During the loop, Kim weakened back into a tropical storm, with tropical depression status regained by December 12 as Kim moved northwest. The system recurved east of Taiwan, dissipating by December 14.

=== Severe Tropical Storm Lex ===
- Severe tropical storm (JMA)
- Tropical storm (SSHWS)
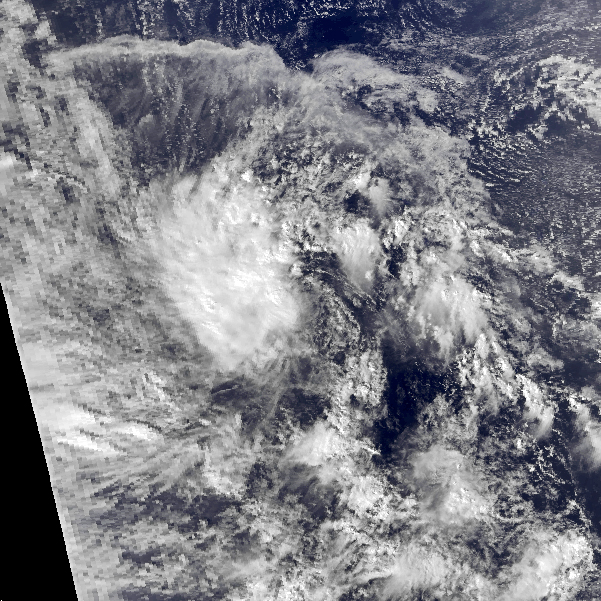
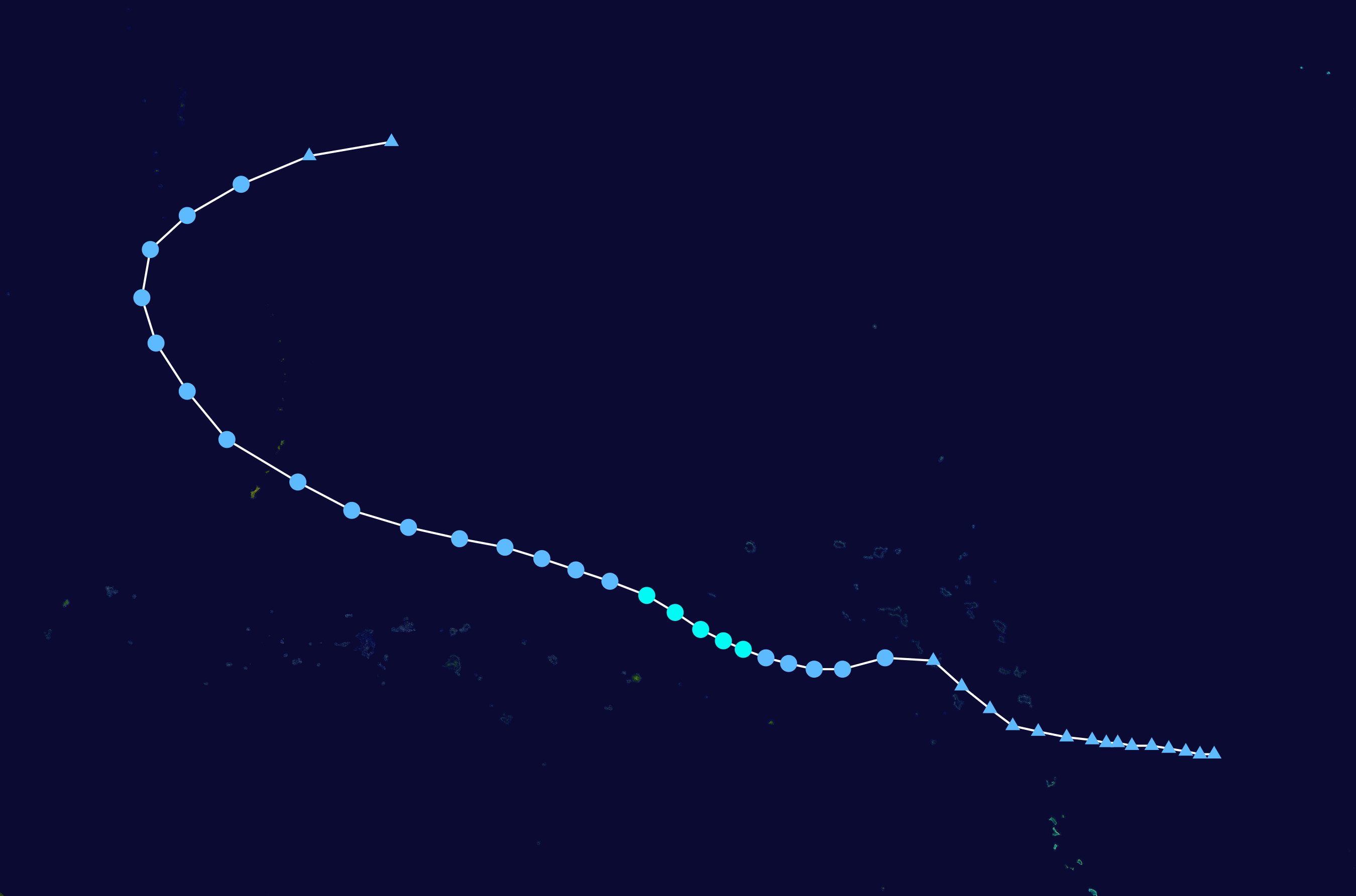
- Duration: December 3 – December 9
- Peak intensity: 95 km/h (60 mph) (10-min); 995 hPa (mbar)

The initial tropical disturbance formed on November 30 in the wake of Kim near the International Date Line. The system moved west-northwest, developing into a tropical depression and tropical storm on December 4. Lex remained a tropical storm for one day, before weakening back into a tropical disturbance on December 5 due to vertical wind shear caused by Typhoon Kim and an upper trough nearby from the northwest. The depression passed between Guam and Saipan on December 7. Lex recurved south of Iwo Jima on December 8 before becoming an extratropical cyclone on December 9.

=== Typhoon Marge (Aning) ===
- Very strong typhoon (JMA)
- Category 2 typhoon (SSHWS)
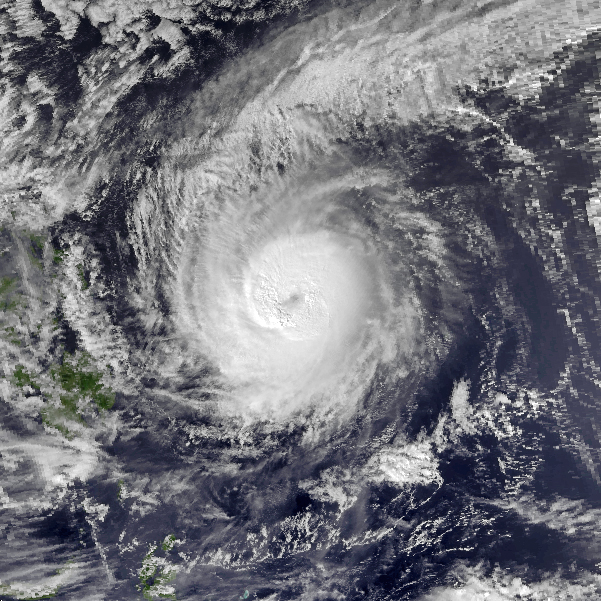
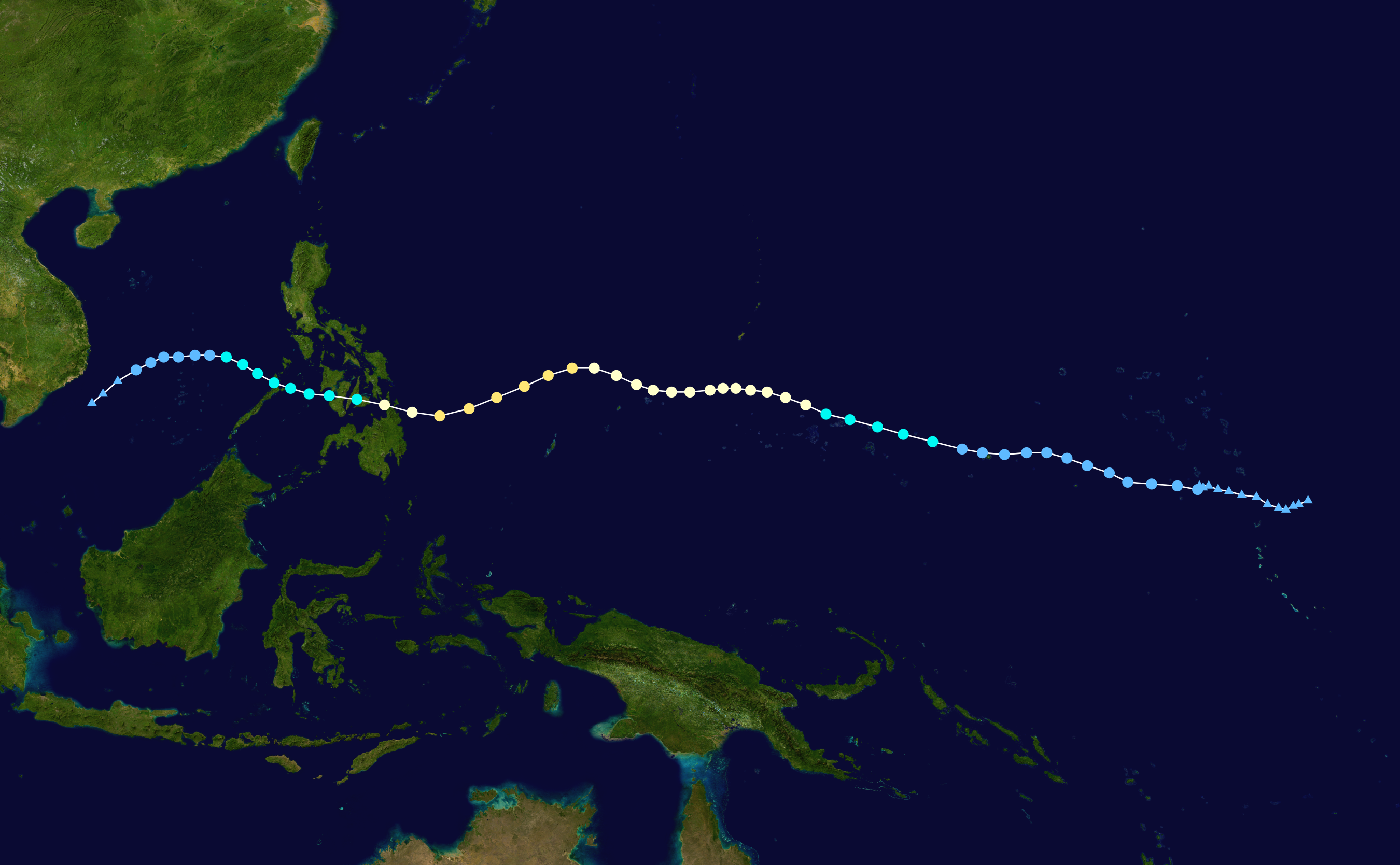
- Duration: December 14 – December 23
- Peak intensity: 155 km/h (100 mph) (10-min); 950 hPa (mbar)

A long tracked system, the initial tropical disturbance which led to Marge was noted near the International Date Line on December 10. Moving north of due west the disturbance was slow to organize, becoming a tropical depression on December 14 southwest of Enewetak. The system strengthened into a tropical storm on December 15, and a typhoon by December 17. Early on December 20, Marge peaked in intensity before turning south of due west due to a strong surface high to its north. On December 21, Marge moved into the southern Philippines which accelerated its weakening trend. On December 22, Marge regained tropical storm status and soon after moving into the South China Sea, the cyclone weakened into a tropical depression late on December 23. The depression moved westward for another day before dissipating on December 24. Marge's circulation aided the global journey of the Rutan Voyager aircraft, which went on to circle the Earth on one tank of fuel.

=== Typhoon Norris (Bidang) ===
- Very strong typhoon (JMA)
- Category 2 typhoon (SSHWS)
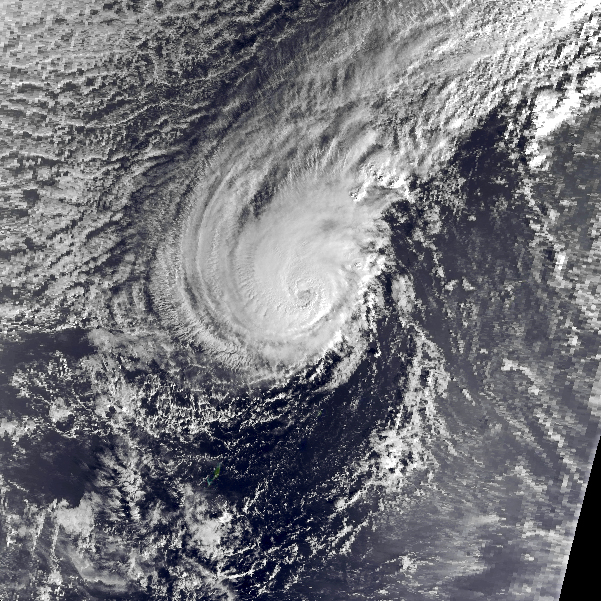
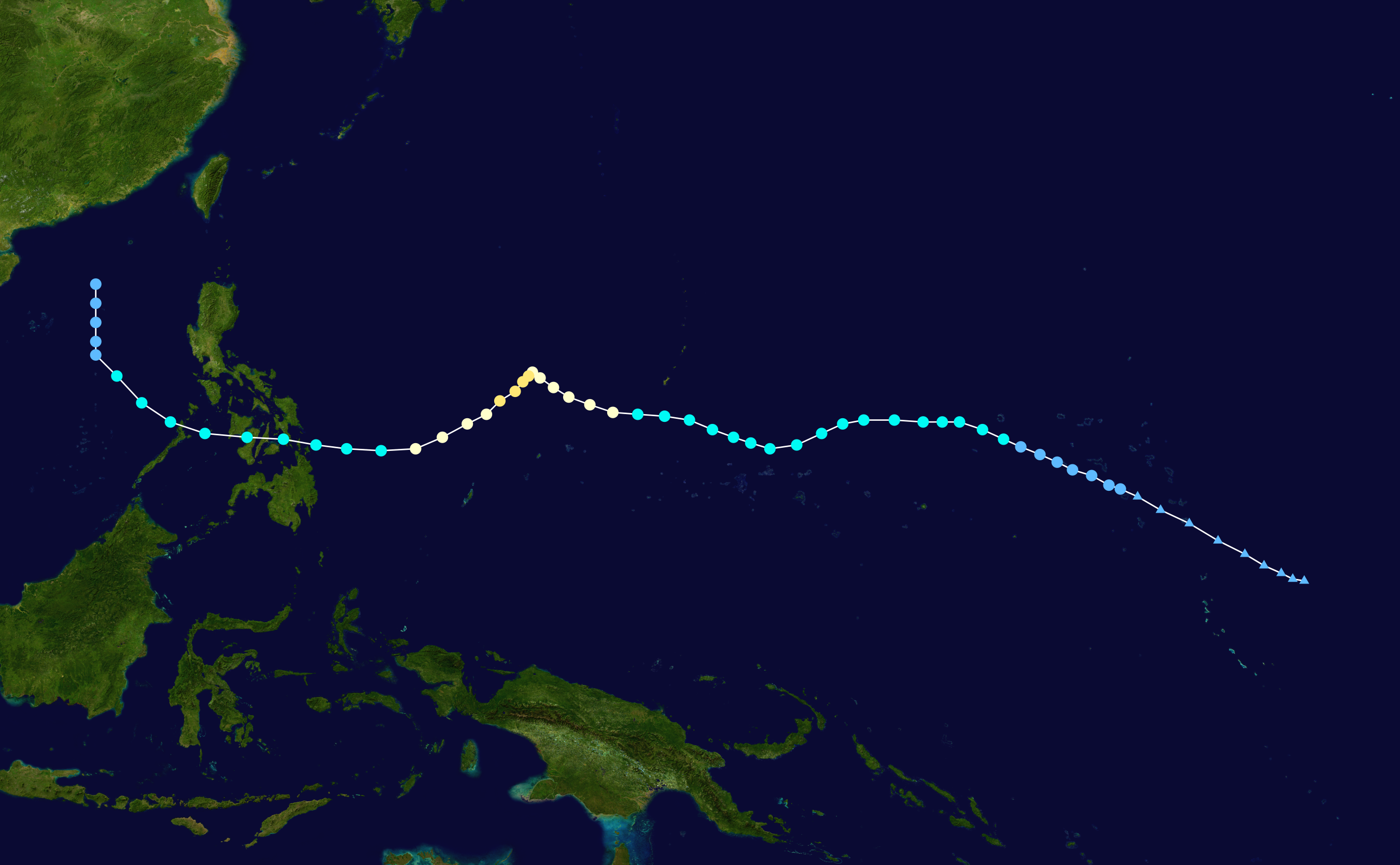
- Duration: December 21, 1986 – January 3, 1987
- Peak intensity: 155 km/h (100 mph) (10-min); 955 hPa (mbar)

The initial tropical disturbance formed near the International Date Line on December 17, and initially moved west-northwest. The system slowly organized, becoming a tropical depression December 21, and then a tropical storm on December 23 as it turned more to the west due to a strengthening ridge of high pressure to its north. The cyclone steadily strengthened over the next four days, initially hampered by strong east winds aloft. As the storm moved south of Guam, wind gusts to 50 knots (93 km/h) were recorded on the island. Norris became a typhoon on December 27. Over the next day and half, intensification continued. On December 28, a strong surface high pressure system turned Norris to the southwest, and led to slow weakening. The cyclone regained tropical storm strength on December 30 while turning more to the west. Norris crossed the southern Philippines on December 31 and January 1, weakening into a tropical depression as it emerged into the South China Sea. Strong southeast winds aloft prevented redevelopment of the depression. Norris' remnant circulation turned northwest and dissipated on January 2 well to the south of Hong Kong.

== Storm names ==
During the season 26 named tropical cyclones developed in the Western Pacific and were named by the Joint Typhoon Warning Center, when it was determined that they had become tropical storms. These names were contributed to a revised list which started on 1979.

Judy	Ken	Lola	Mac	Nancy	Owen	Peggy	Roger	Sarah	Tip	Vera	Wayne	Abby
Ben	Carmen	Dom	Ellen	Forrest	Georgia	Herbert	Ida	Joe	Kim	Lex	Marge	Norris

=== Philippines ===
Akang	Bising	Klaring	Deling	Emang
Gading	Heling	Iliang	Loleng	Miding
Norming	Oyang	Pasing	Ruping	Susang
Tering	Uding	Weling	Yaning	
Auxiliary list
				Aning
Bidang	Katring (unused)	Delang (unused)	Esang (unused)	Garding (unused)

The Philippine Atmospheric, Geophysical and Astronomical Services Administration uses its own naming scheme for tropical cyclones in their area of responsibility. PAGASA assigns names to tropical depressions that form within their area of responsibility and any tropical cyclone that might move into their area of responsibility. Should the list of names for a given year prove to be insufficient, names are taken from an auxiliary list, the first 6 of which are published each year before the season starts. Names not retired from this list will be used again in the 1990 season. This is the same list used for the 1982 season. PAGASA uses its own naming scheme that starts in the Filipino alphabet, with names of Filipino female names ending with "ng" (A, B, K, D, etc.). Names that were not assigned/going to use are marked in gray.

== Season effects ==
This is a table of all of the storms that have formed in the 1986 Pacific typhoon season. It includes their duration, names, affected areas, damages, and death totals. Deaths in parentheses are additional and indirect (an example of an indirect death would be a traffic accident), but were still related to that storm. Damage and deaths include totals while the storm was extratropical, a wave, or a low, and all of the damage figures are in 1986 USD. Names listed in parentheses were assigned by PAGASA.

Name	Dates	Peak intensity			Areas affected	Damage (USD)	Deaths	Ref(s).
Name	Dates	Category	Wind speed	Pressure	Areas affected	Damage (USD)	Deaths	Ref(s).
Judy (Akang)	January 29 – February 6	Typhoon	130 km/h (80 mph)	970 hPa (28.64 inHg)	Caroline Islands	None	None	
TD	April 5–7	Tropical depression	Not specified	1,002 hPa (29.59 inHg)	Philippines	None	None	
Ken (Bising)	April 24 – May 3	Typhoon	120 km/h (75 mph)	980 hPa (28.94 inHg)	Caroline Islands	None	None	
TD	May 10–11	Tropical depression	Not specified	1,000 hPa (29.53 inHg)	Thailand, Cambodia	None	None	
Lola	May 16–23	Violent typhoon	220 km/h (135 mph)	910 hPa (26.87 inHg)	Caroline Islands	None	None	
Mac (Klaring)	May 17–30	Tropical storm	75 km/h (45 mph)	992 hPa (29.29 inHg)	Vietnam, South China, Philippines, Taiwan, Ryukyu Islands	None	None	
TD	June 3–5	Tropical depression	Not specified	1,000 hPa (29.53 inHg)	None	None	None	
Nancy (Deling)	June 20–24	Typhoon	130 km/h (80 mph)	955 hPa (28.20 inHg)	Philippines, East China, Taiwan, Ryukyu Islands, South Korea	None	12	
TD	June 25–26	Tropical depression	Not specified	1,000 hPa (29.53 inHg)	South China	None	None	
Owen (Emang)	June 26 – July 2	Tropical storm	85 km/h (55 mph)	985 hPa (29.09 inHg)	Ryukyu Islands	None	None	
Peggy (Gading)	June 30 – July 12	Violent typhoon	205 km/h (125 mph)	900 hPa (26.58 inHg)	Mariana Islands, Philippines, Taiwan, China	$2.5 million	422	
Roger (Heling)	July 11–18	Typhoon	140 km/h (85 mph)	955 hPa (28.20 inHg)	Japan	None	None	
Nine	July 20–24	Tropical storm	65 km/h (40 mph)	996 hPa (29.41 inHg)	South China	None	None	
TD	July 25–26	Tropical depression	Not specified	1,008 hPa (29.77 inHg)	Taiwan	None	None	
Sarah (Iliang)	July 29 – August 4	Severe tropical storm	100 km/h (60 mph)	980 hPa (28.94 inHg)	Philippines, Japan	$627 million	14	
TD	July 31	Tropical depression	Not specified	1,000 hPa (29.53 inHg)	None	None	None	
TD	August 3–6	Tropical depression	Not specified	1,008 hPa (29.77 inHg)	Taiwan	None	None	
TD	August 5	Tropical depression	Not specified	1,004 hPa (29.65 inHg)	Marshall Islands	None	None	
Georgette	August 8–15	Severe tropical storm	110 km/h (70 mph)	970 hPa (28.64 inHg)	Marshall Islands	None	None	
TD	August 9–12	Tropical depression	Not specified	1,004 hPa (29.65 inHg)	Vietnam, South China	None	12	
TD	August 9–11	Tropical depression	Not specified	1,004 hPa (29.65 inHg)	South China	None	None	
Tip	August 10–24	Typhoon	130 km/h (80 mph)	965 hPa (28.50 inHg)	None	None	None	
Vera (Loleng)	August 13–28	Very strong typhoon	165 km/h (105 mph)	925 hPa (27.32 inHg)	Mariana Islands, Taiwan, East China, Japan, Korean Peninsula	$22 million	23	
Wayne (Miding)	August 16 – September 6	Typhoon	140 km/h (85 mph)	955 hPa (28.20 inHg)	Philippines, Taiwan, China, Vietnam, Laos, Thailand	$399 million	490	
TD	August 25–26	Tropical depression	Not specified	1,004 hPa (29.65 inHg)	None	None	None	
TD	August 27–29	Tropical depression	Not specified	1,004 hPa (29.65 inHg)	None	None	None	
TD	August 28–30	Tropical depression	Not specified	1,012 hPa (29.88 inHg)	Wake Island	None	None	
Fifteen	August 28 – September 3	Tropical storm	65 km/h (40 mph)	992 hPa (29.29 inHg)	Japan	None	None	
TD	August 31 – September 1	Tropical depression	Not specified	1,000 hPa (29.53 inHg)	Mariana Islands	None	None	
TD	September 2–3	Tropical depression	Not specified	1,000 hPa (29.53 inHg)	None	None	None	
Abby (Norming)	September 12–20	Typhoon	155 km/h (95 mph)	945 hPa (27.91 inHg)	Caroline Islands, Mariana Islands, Philippines, Taiwan, East China	$81 million	13	
Ben	September 18–30	Very strong typhoon	185 km/h (115 mph)	920 hPa (27.17 inHg)	Mariana Islands	None	None	
Carmen	October 1–8	Very strong typhoon	185 km/h (115 mph)	940 hPa (27.76 inHg)	Caroline Islands, Mariana Islands	None	None	
Dom (Oyang)	October 5–12	Tropical storm	75 km/h (45 mph)	996 hPa (29.41 inHg)	Philippines, Vietnam	$4 million	16	
TD	October 7	Tropical depression	Not specified	1,006 hPa (29.71 inHg)	Philippines	None	None	
Ellen (Pasing)	October 9–20	Typhoon	130 km/h (80 mph)	965 hPa (28.50 inHg)	Philippines, South China	None	None	
Forrest	October 13–20	Very strong typhoon	165 km/h (105 mph)	930 hPa (27.46 inHg)	Marshall Islands, Mariana Islands	None	None	
Georgia (Ruping)	October 17–23	Tropical storm	85 km/h (55 mph)	985 hPa (29.09 inHg)	Philippines, Vietnam, Laos	None	None	
Susang	October 30 – November 1	Tropical depression	45 km/h (30 mph)	1,006 hPa (29.71 inHg)	Philippines	None	None	
Herbert (Tering)	November 6–12	Severe tropical storm	110 km/h (70 mph)	985 hPa (29.09 inHg)	Philippines, Vietnam	None	None	
Ida (Uding)	November 10–18	Severe tropical storm	95 km/h (60 mph)	985 hPa (29.09 inHg)	Philippines	None	None	
Joe (Weling)	November 17–25	Typhoon	155 km/h (95 mph)	940 hPa (27.76 inHg)	Philippines	None	None	
TD	November 21–26	Tropical depression	Not specified	1,004 hPa (29.65 inHg)	None	None	None	
Kim (Yaning)	November 27 – December 13	Violent typhoon	205 km/h (125 mph)	905 hPa (26.72 inHg)	Philippines	None	None	
TD	November 30 – December 3	Tropical depression	Not specified	1,004 hPa (29.65 inHg)	Vietnam	None	None	
Lex	December 2–8	Severe tropical storm	95 km/h (60 mph)	994 hPa (29.35 inHg)	Marshall Islands, Caroline Islands, Mariana Islands	None	None	
Marge (Aning)	December 12–25	Typhoon	155 km/h (95 mph)	950 hPa (28.05 inHg)	Caroline Islands, Mariana Islands, Philippines	None	None	
Norris (Bidang)	December 21, 1986 – January 3, 1987	Typhoon	155 km/h (95 mph)	955 hPa (28.20 inHg)	Caroline Islands, Mariana Islands, Philippines	None	None	
Season aggregates
48 systems	January 29, 1986 – January 3, 1987		205 km/h (125 mph)	900 hPa (26.58 inHg)		>$509 million	>988	

== See also ==
- List of Pacific typhoon seasons
- 1986 Pacific hurricane season
- 1986 Atlantic hurricane season
- 1986 North Indian Ocean cyclone season
- Australian cyclone seasons: 1985–86, 1986–87
- South Pacific cyclone seasons: 1985–86, 1986–87
- South-West Indian Ocean cyclone seasons: 1985–86, 1986–87
