= 1985–86 Australian region cyclone season =

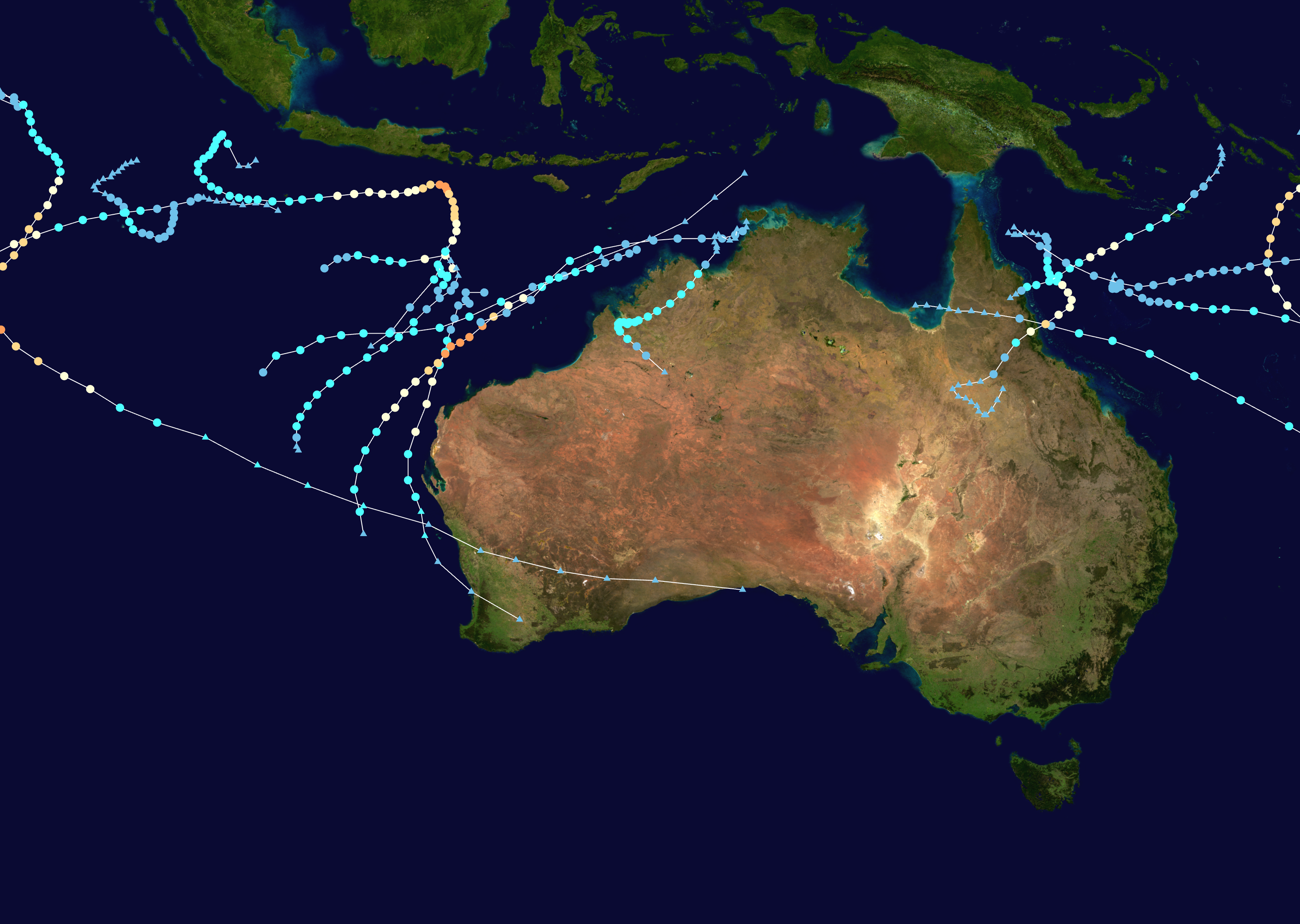
- Season summary map

Seasonal boundaries
- First system formed: 26 November 1985
- Last system dissipated: 21 May 1986

Strongest storm
- Name: Victor
  - Maximum winds: 185 km/h (115 mph) (10-minute sustained)
  - Lowest pressure: 930 hPa (mbar)

Seasonal statistics
- Tropical lows: 17
- Tropical cyclones: 16
- Severe tropical cyclones: 8
- Total fatalities: 153
- Total damage: $250 million (1986 USD)

Related articles
- 1985–86 South-West Indian Ocean cyclone season; 1985–86 South Pacific cyclone season

The 1985–86 Australian region cyclone season was an above average tropical cyclone season. It officially started on 1 November 1985, and officially ended on 30 April 1986.

== Systems ==
=== Severe Tropical Cyclone Nicholas ===
- Category 3 severe tropical cyclone (Australian scale)
- Category 3 tropical cyclone (SSHWS)
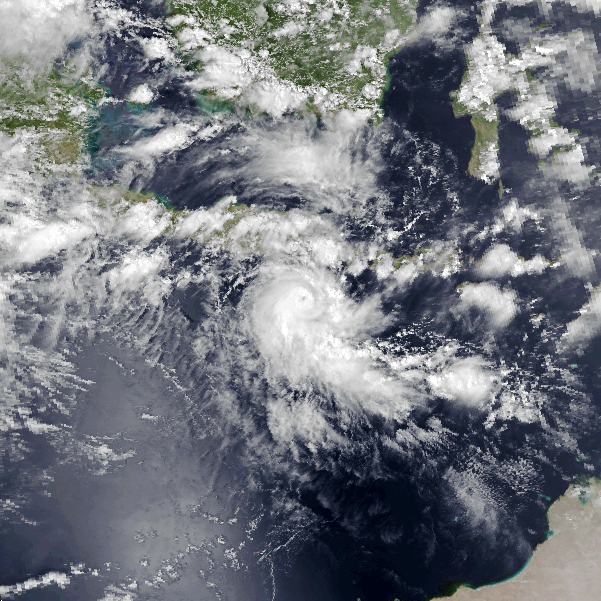
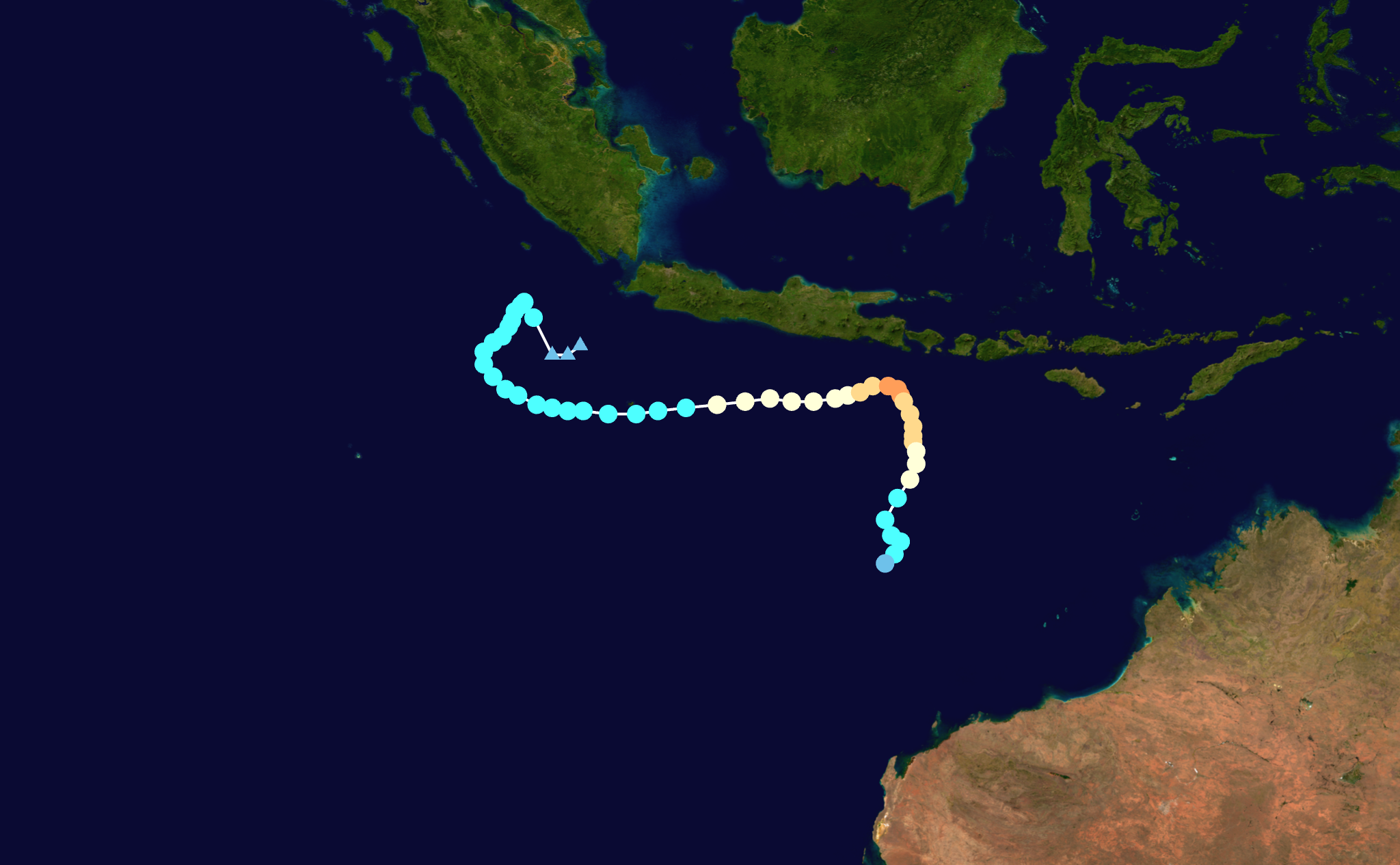
- Duration: 26 November – 7 December
- Peak intensity: 155 km/h (100 mph) (10-min); 945 hPa (mbar)

Tropical Cyclone Nicholas originated from a broad area of low pressure associated with a monsoonal trough south of Sumatra on 25 November. It tracked south and gradually organized itself and became a tropical cyclone early on 29 November. It then began to move east and passed through major shipping routes near Christmas Island, though none of the ships record any extensive winds from the nearby cyclone. Nicholas, while remaining a small system, continued to intensify and by 3 December reached a peak intensity as a category four cyclone with winds of 115 mph (185 km/h) 10-min sustained and a pressure of 945 hPa. Afterwards the cyclone turned almost directly south and gradually weakened. On 7 December Nicholas's convection began to wane and the system had fully dissipated by that evening.

=== Tropical Cyclone 03P ===
- Tropical depression (SSHWS)
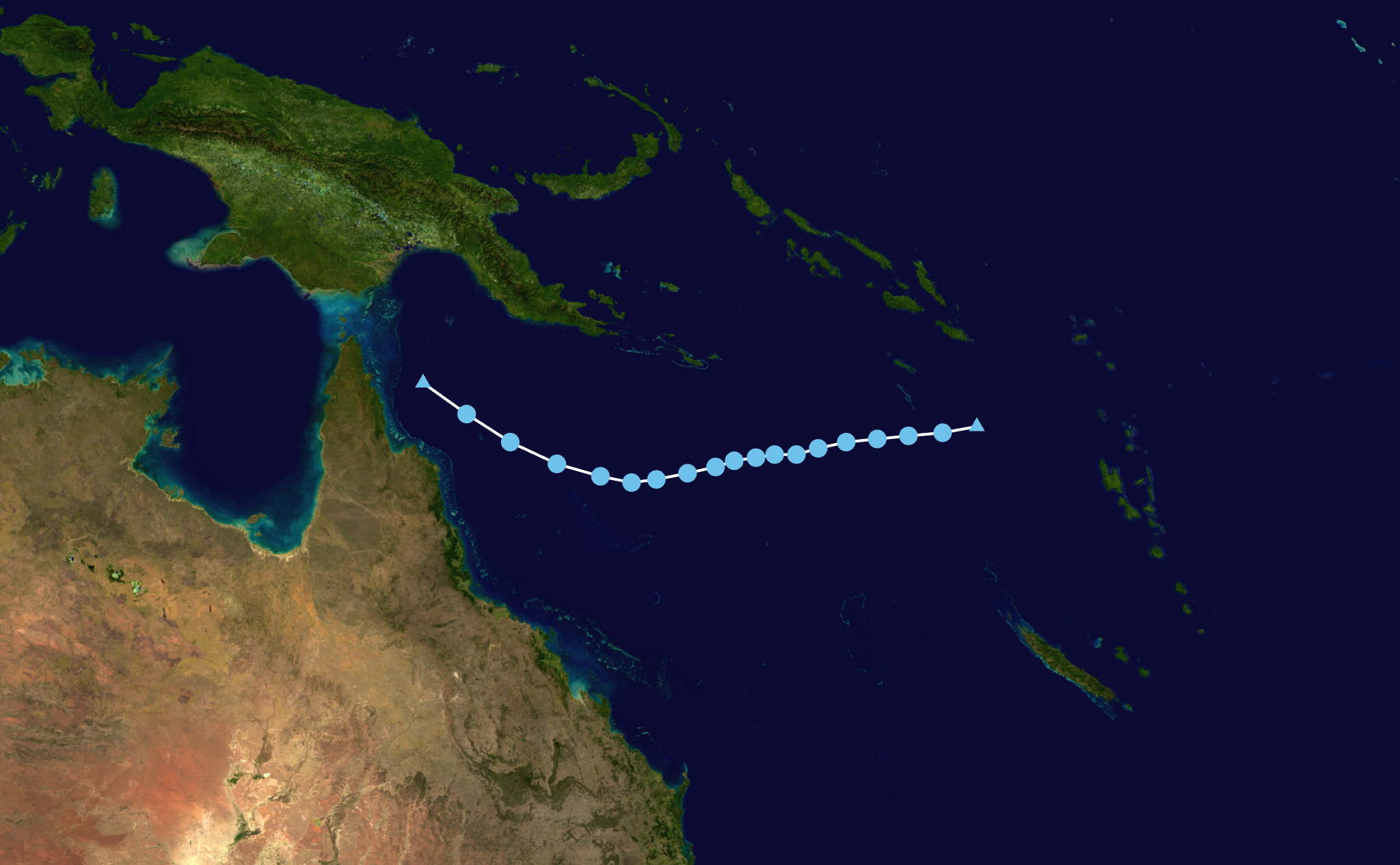
- Duration: 12 December – 16 December
- Peak intensity: 55 km/h (35 mph) (1-min); 1000 hPa (mbar)

Tropical Cyclone 03S existed from 11 December to 14 December.

=== Tropical Cyclone Ophelia ===
- Category 1 tropical cyclone (Australian scale)
- Tropical storm (SSHWS)
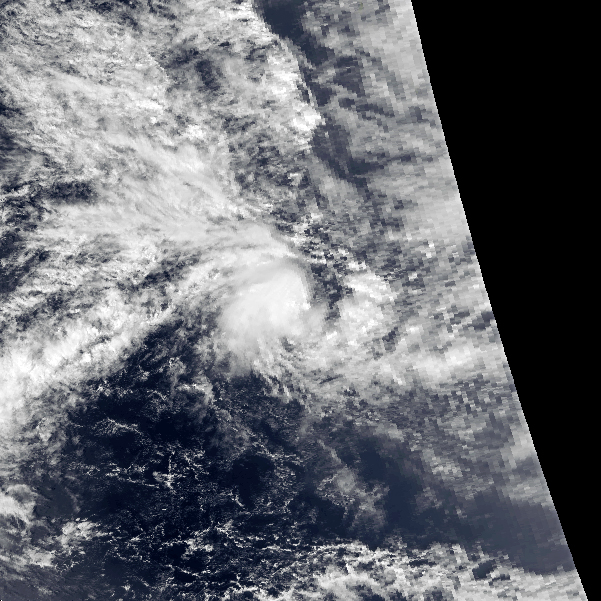
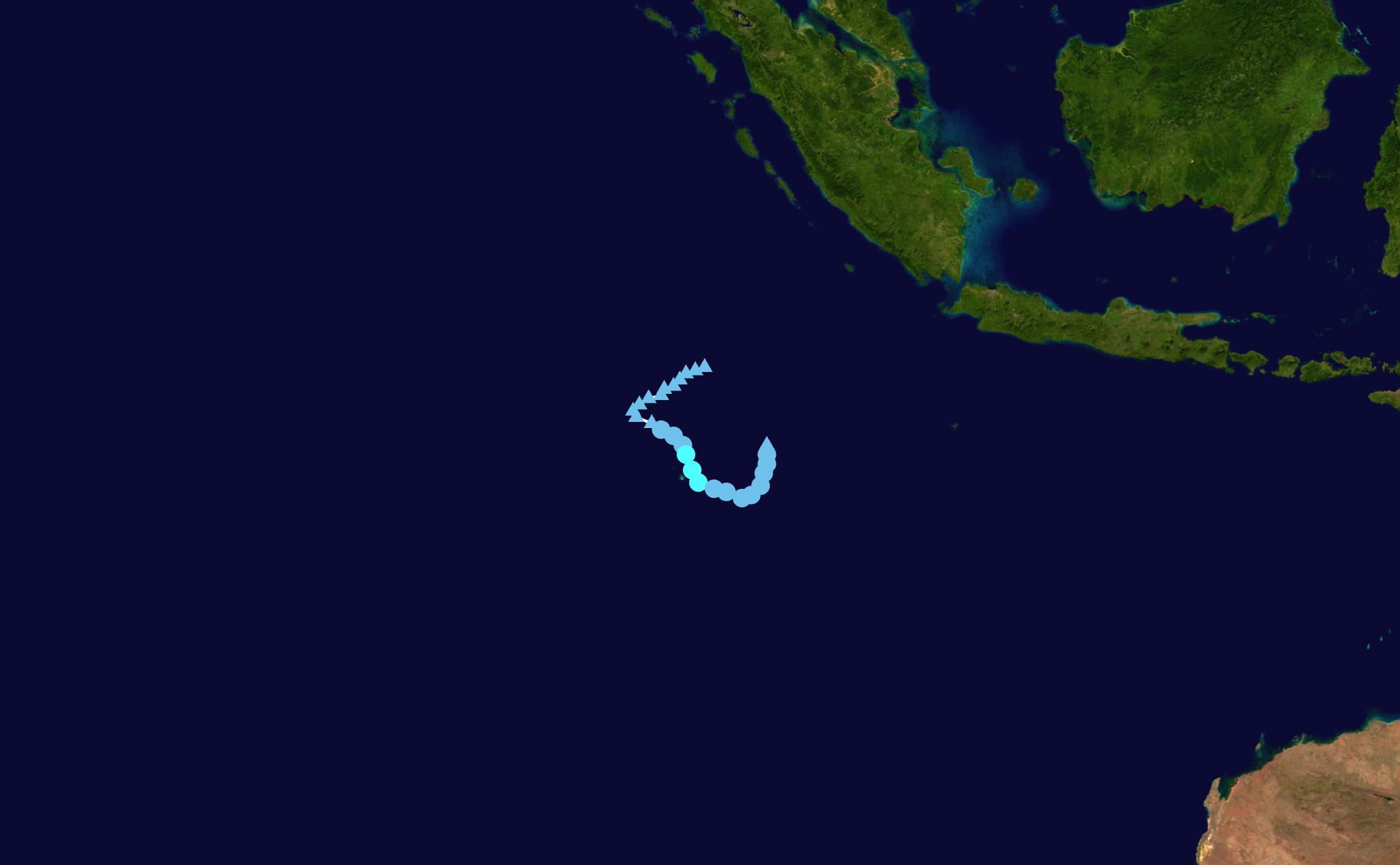
- Duration: 7 January – 12 January
- Peak intensity: 85 km/h (50 mph) (10-min); 986 hPa (mbar)

Tropical Cyclone Ophelia occurred from 7 January until 12 January 1986 near Cocos Island. Its estimated lowest pressure was 985 hPa.

=== Tropical Cyclone 08S ===
- Tropical storm (SSHWS)
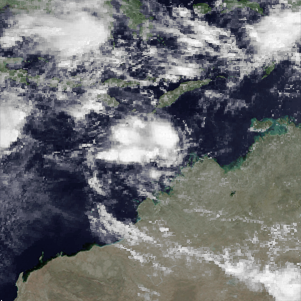
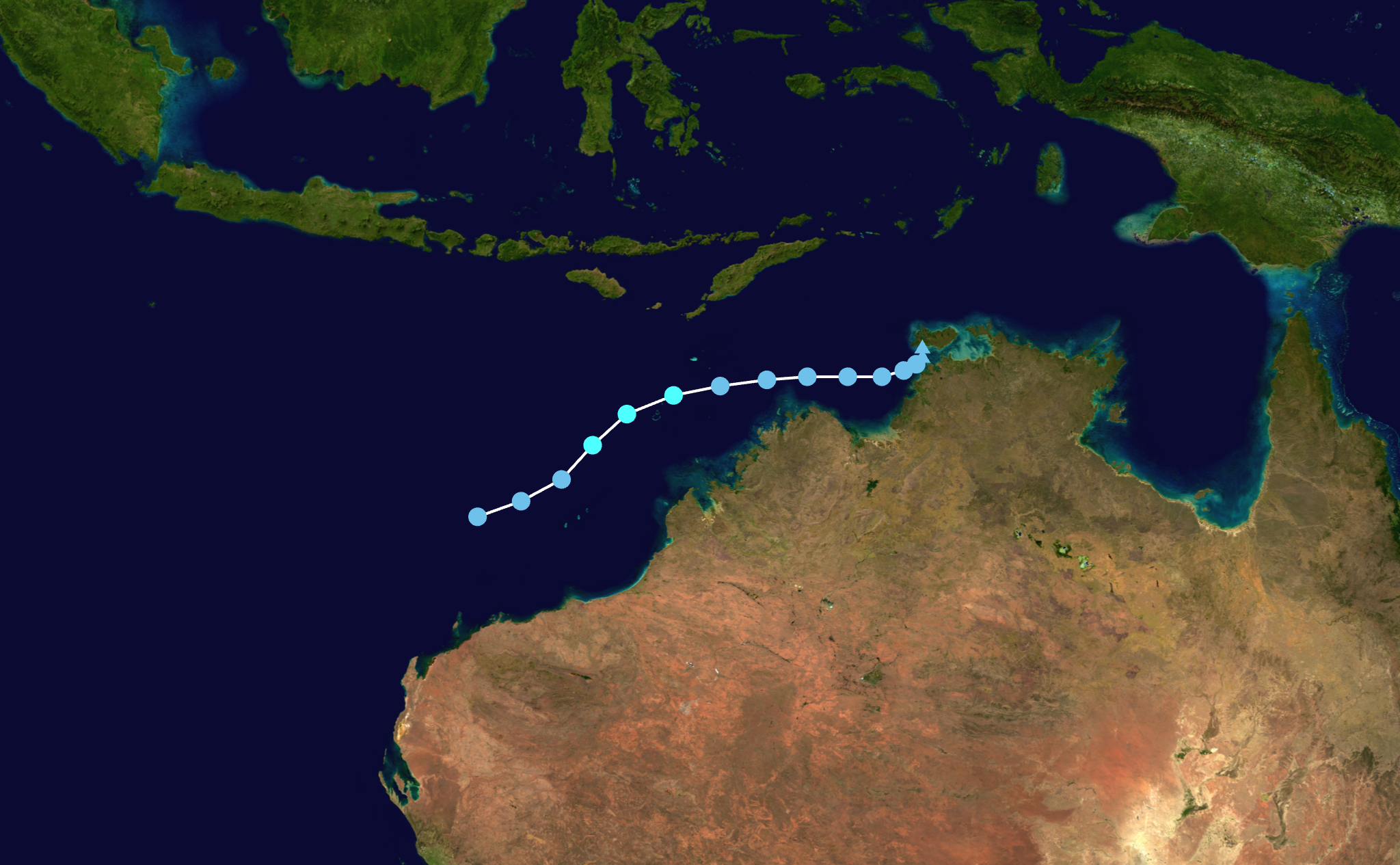
- Duration: 11 January – 14 January
- Peak intensity: 65 km/h (40 mph) (1-min); 997 hPa (mbar)

Tropical Cyclone 08S existed from 11 January to 14 January.

=== Tropical Cyclone Hector ===
- Category 1 tropical cyclone (Australian scale)
- Tropical storm (SSHWS)
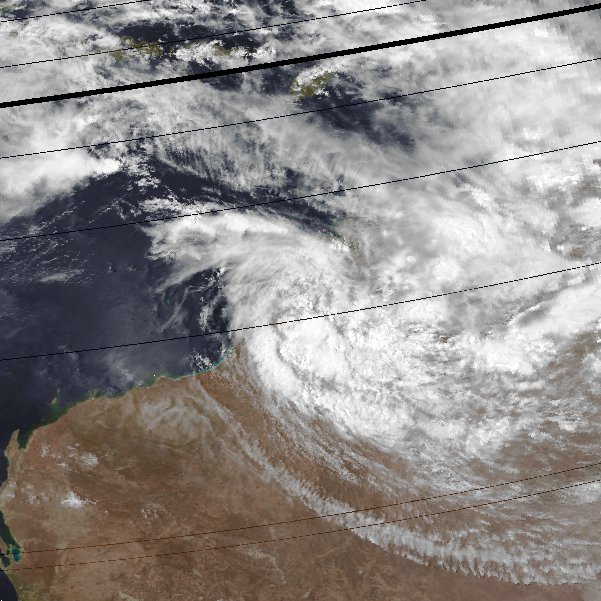
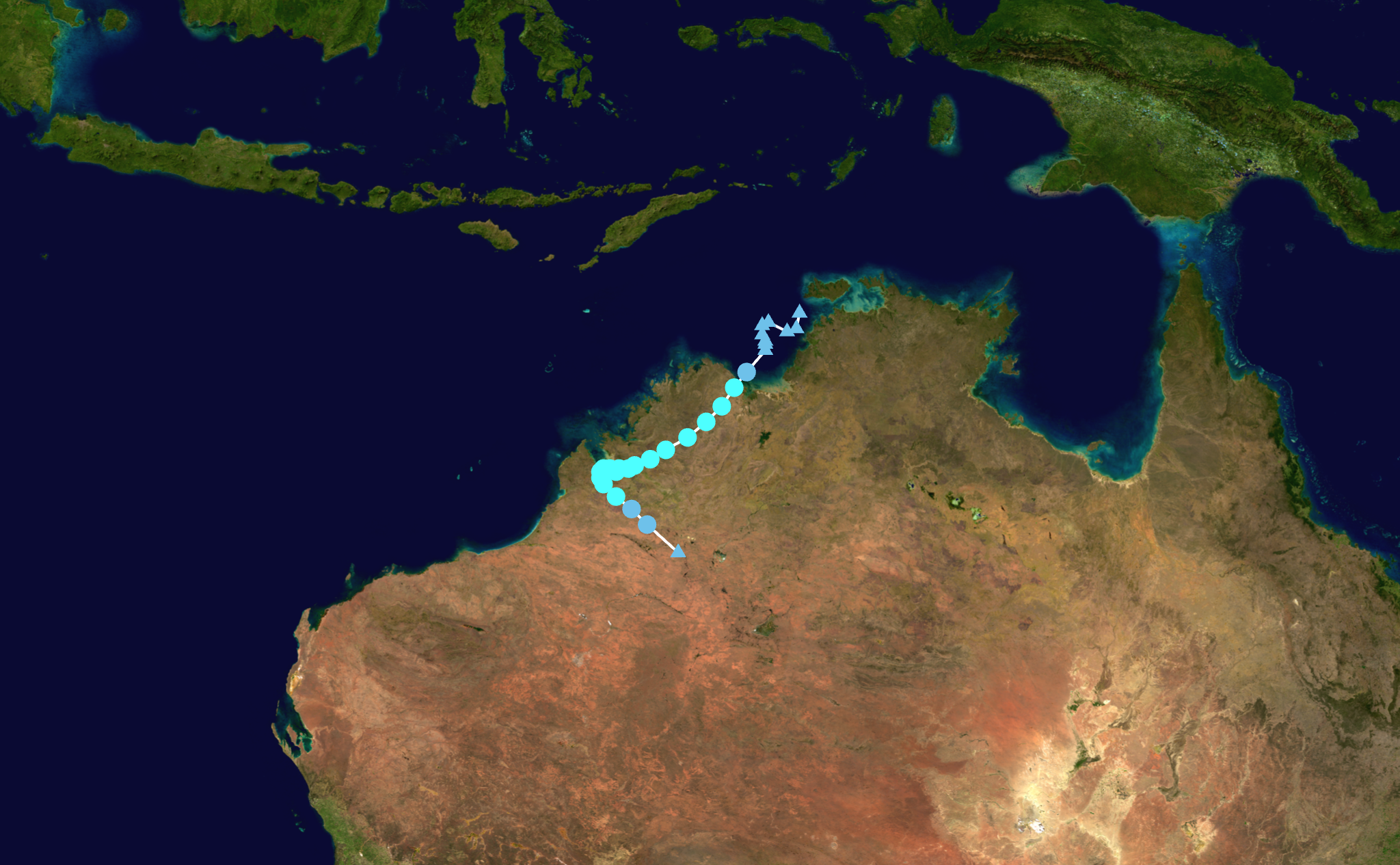
- Duration: 17 January – 24 January
- Peak intensity: 75 km/h (45 mph) (10-min); 982 hPa (mbar)

Tropical Cyclone Hector occurred from 17 January until 24 January 1986. It crossed the coast near Wyndham, Western Australia and its estimated lowest pressure was 982 hPa. Hector caused significant flooding in the Kimberley region of Western Australia.

=== Tropical Cyclone Pancho ===
- Category 2 tropical cyclone (Australian scale)
- Category 1 tropical cyclone (SSHWS)
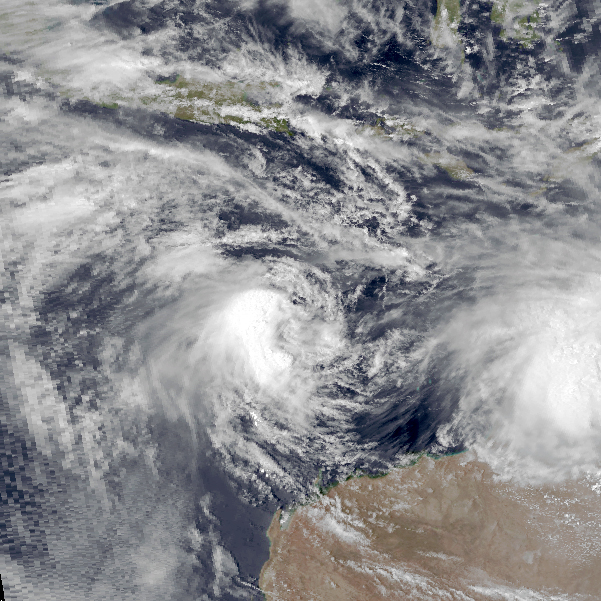
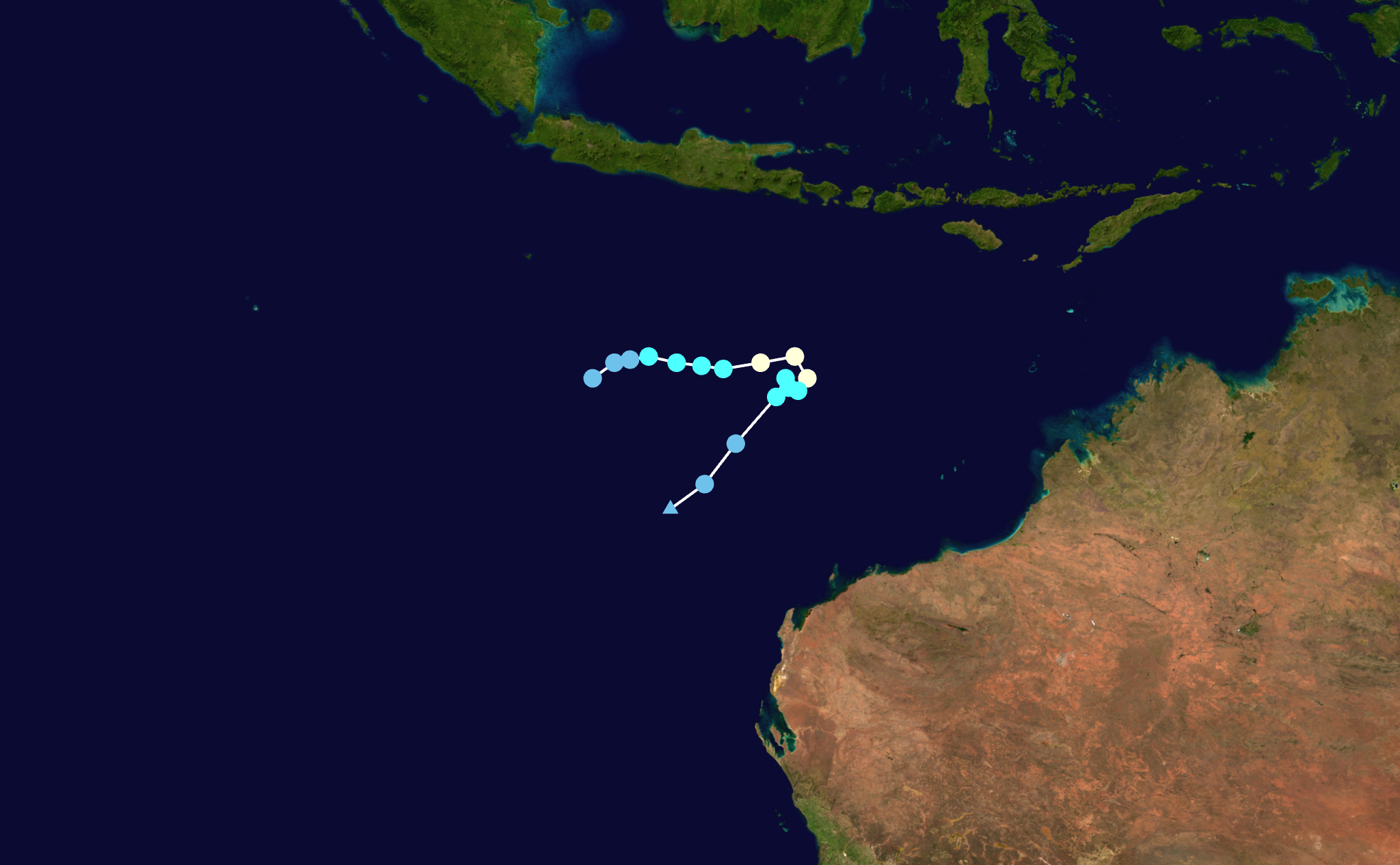
- Duration: 18 January – 21 January
- Peak intensity: 100 km/h (65 mph) (10-min); 976 hPa (mbar)

Tropical Cyclone Pancho occurred from 18 January until 22 January 1986 and remained entirely within the Indian Ocean off Western Australia. Its estimated lowest pressure was 976 hPa.

=== Tropical Cyclone Vernon ===
- Category 1 tropical cyclone (Australian scale)
- Tropical storm (SSHWS)
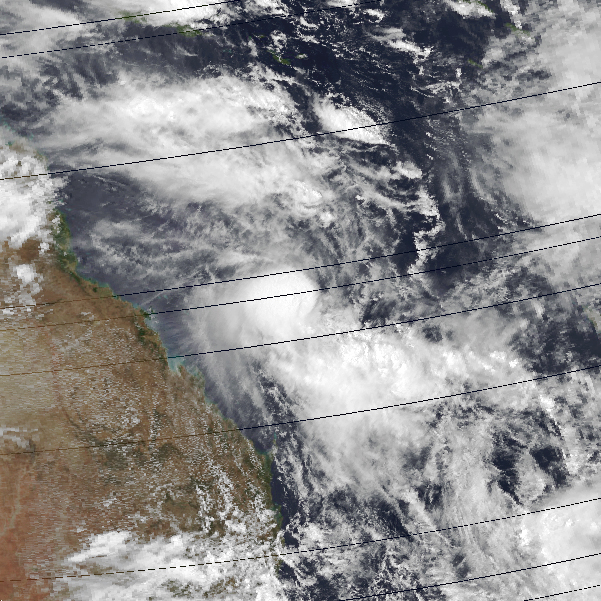
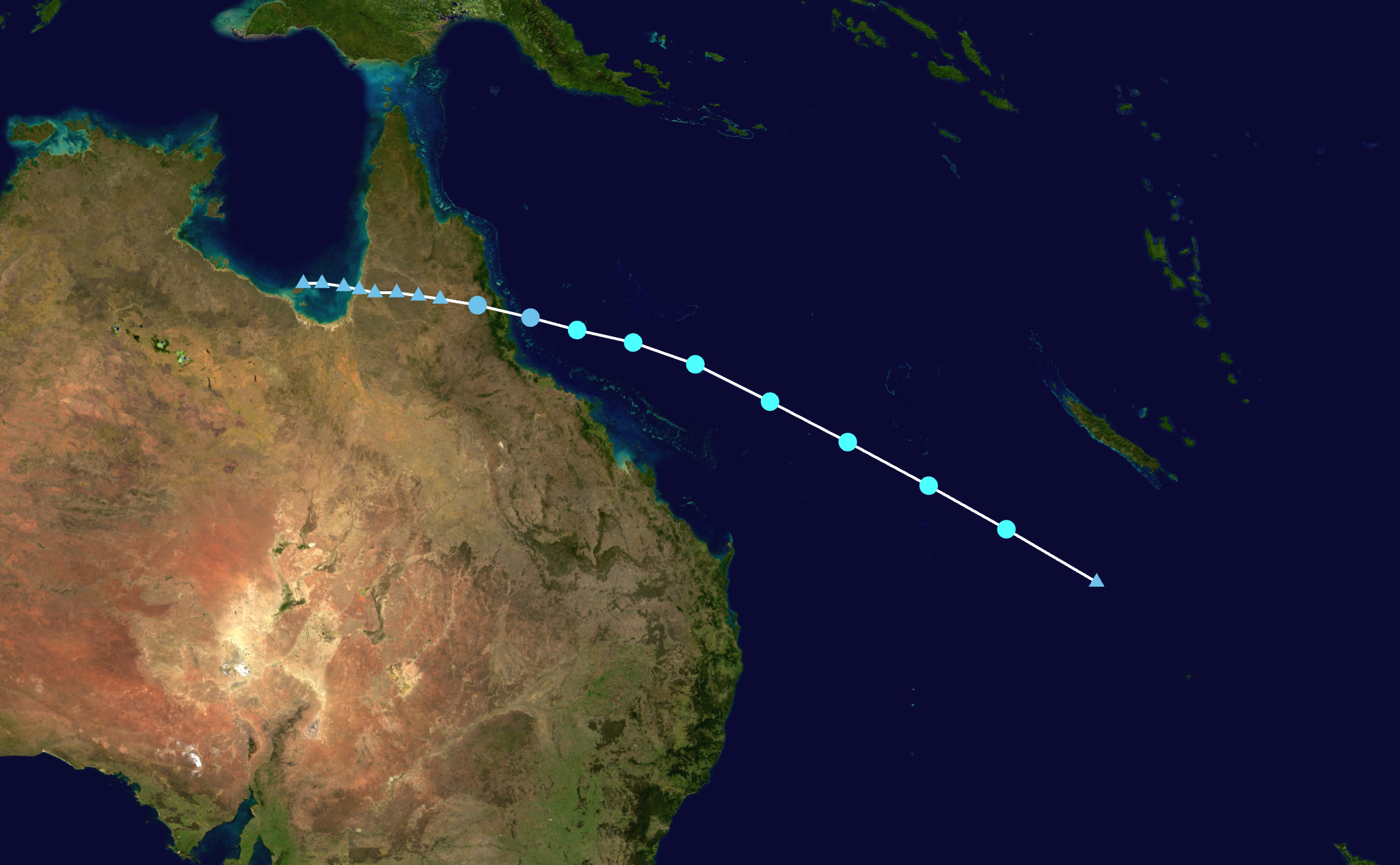
- Duration: 21 January – 24 January
- Peak intensity: 85 km/h (50 mph) (10-min); 990 hPa (mbar)

Vernon was a weak cyclone that occurred from 21 January until 24 January 1986 and formed in the Gulf of Carpentaria. It crossed Cape York and continued on into the Coral Sea. Its estimated lowest pressure was 990 hPa.

=== Severe Tropical Cyclone Winifred ===
- Category 3 severe tropical cyclone (Australian scale)
- Category 2 tropical cyclone (SSHWS)
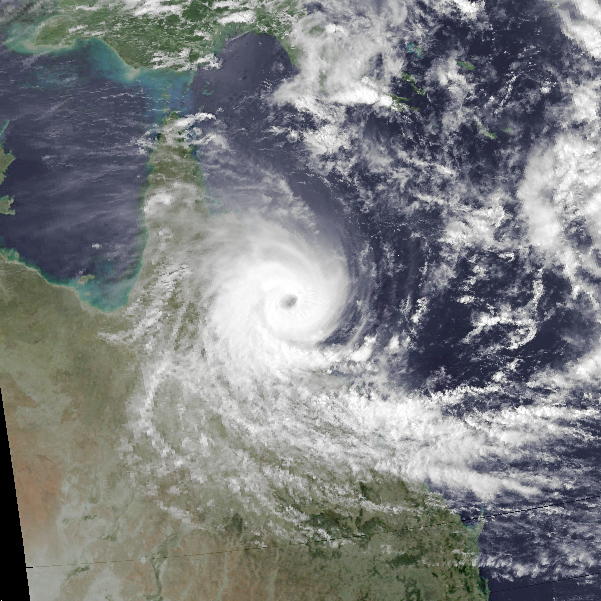
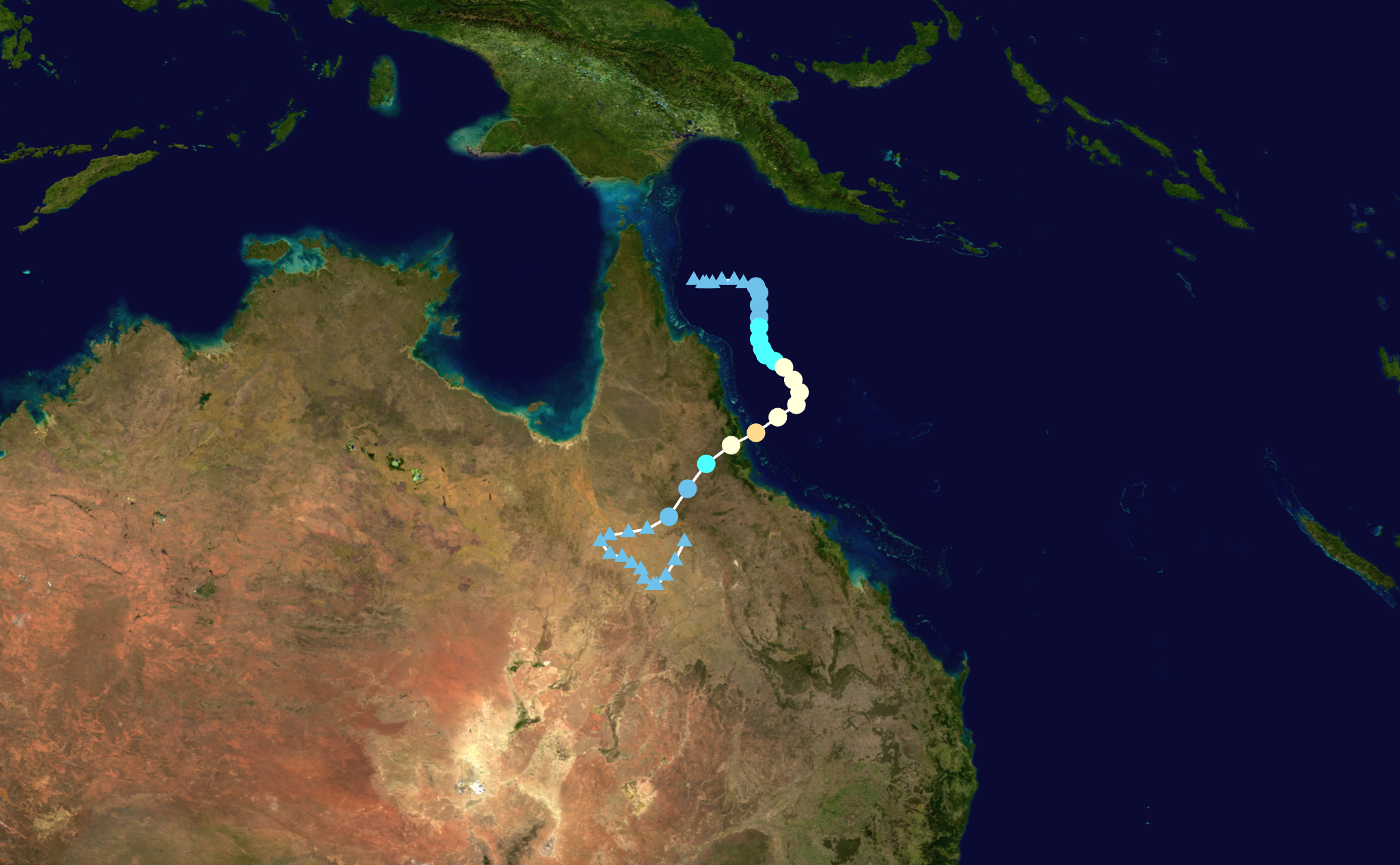
- Duration: 27 January – 5 February
- Peak intensity: 155 km/h (100 mph) (10-min); 957 hPa (mbar)

The precursor tropical low to Severe Tropical Cyclone Winifred was first observed on 27 January, about 450 km (280 mi) north of Cairns, Queensland. Initially drifting toward the east, the low pressure system showed signs of slow development. Early on 29 January, the system turned south as it gradually continued to gain in strength. Based on data from the GMS, the low had become sufficiently well-organized to be classified as a tropical cyclone by 30 January, retaining a minimum central pressure of 995 mbar (hPa; 29.38 inHg). Accordingly, the system was assigned the name Winifred at 1400 UTC that same day, as it slowly proceeded southward.

Steady intensification continued, and the cyclone reached winds of 118 km/h (73 mph) early on 1 February, the equivalent of a Category 1 hurricane on the Saffir–Simpson Hurricane Scale. During all of Winifred's existence, a canopy of high-level cirrus clouds covered the eye and rainbands of the cyclone, preventing precise location of its centre through satellite observation. Initially, estimates showed the intensifying cyclone retracing to the southeast on the evening of 30 January, almost immediately turning to the southwest overnight on 31 January. Though the eye retained a relatively large diameter of approximately 51 km (32 mi), Winifred continued to deepen as it approached the coast of north Queensland; however, a contraction of the eyewall became evident by 0300 UTC the next day. With time, the eye further decreased in size, with the smallest diameter assessed at 41 km (26 mi) just prior to landfall. In addition, this decrease suggested a reach of peak intensity, and correspondingly, minimum central pressure dropped to 957 mbar (hPa; 957 mbar (28.26 inHg) upon landfall near Silkwood, Queensland at 0445 UTC, the lowest recorded throughout the duration of the cyclone. This pressure, combined with peak winds of around 155 km/h (100 mph 10-minute sustained), would designate Winifred as the equivalent of a Category 2 hurricane on the Saffir–Simpson scale. Moving further inland, Winifred began to lose its discernible radar features and quickly decreased in intensity; however, the cyclone persisted as a weakening tropical depression for approximately five days. Operationally, Winifred was declared dissipated on 6 February.

Prior to the formation of a tropical depression, Tropical Cyclone Advices were initiated at 0600 UTC 29 January. At the time, the precursor low was located about 340 km (210 mi) northeast of Cooktown, Queensland. Consequently, a cyclone watch was declared for coastal areas between Thursday Island and Cooktown; in subsequent advices, the area under watch was extended further to the south. As the storm approached the coastline, the watch was upgraded to a warning from Cape Flattery to Townsville by 1900 UTC 30 January, though watches remained in effect to the north from Lockhart River and to the south from St Lawrence. Over the subsequent days, the area under threat extended further, and by late 31 January, a cyclone warning was in effect from Cooktown to Bowen, as well as a cyclone watch for areas between Cairns and Bowen extending southward to St Lawrence. As the storm turned more toward the south, however, a Flash Tropical Cyclone Advice was issued at 0100 UTC on 1 February, warning of locally destructive winds between Fitzroy Island and Innisfail, as far south as Cardwell. Initially, the forecast position of landfall was pinned near Babinda, where specialists warned of maximum gusts near of 190 km/h (120 mph).

Winifred struck Innisfail, Queensland in February 1986 causing extensive damage. There were three deaths attributed to Winifred.

=== Severe Tropical Cyclone Rhonda ===
- Category 3 severe tropical cyclone (Australian scale)
- Category 1 tropical cyclone (SSHWS)
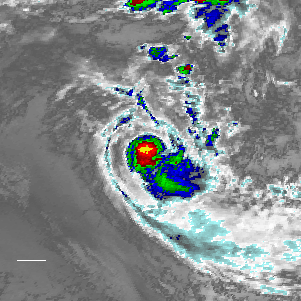
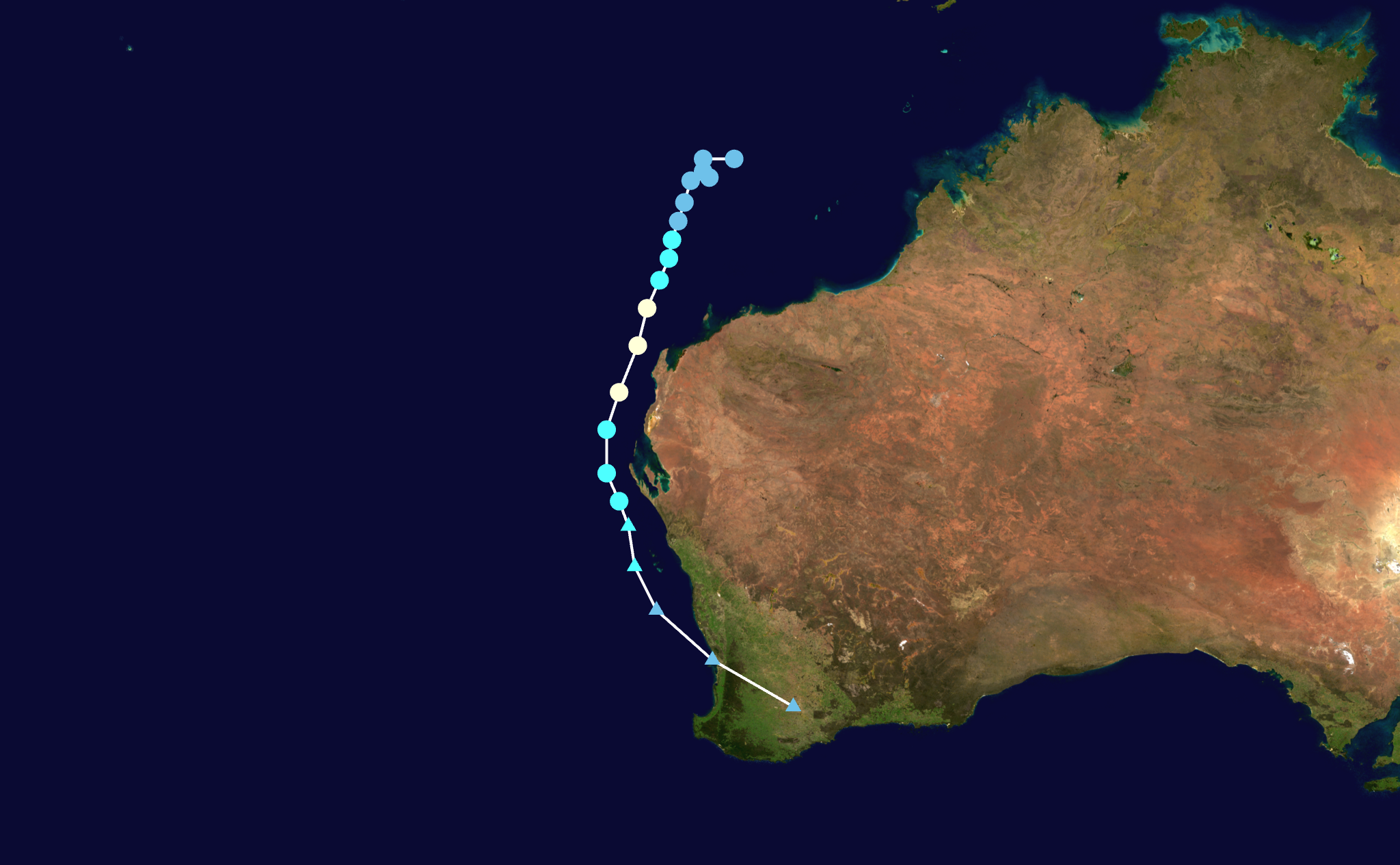
- Duration: 17 February – 21 February
- Peak intensity: 120 km/h (75 mph) (10-min); 968 hPa (mbar)

Tropical Cyclone Rhonda occurred from 17 February until 21 February 1986. It formed off the Pilbara coast and followed the Western Australian coast before weakening and crossing near Perth. Areas around Perth received heavy rain. Its estimated lowest pressure was 968 hPa.

=== Tropical Cyclone Selwyn ===
- Category 2 tropical cyclone (Australian scale)
- Tropical storm (SSHWS)
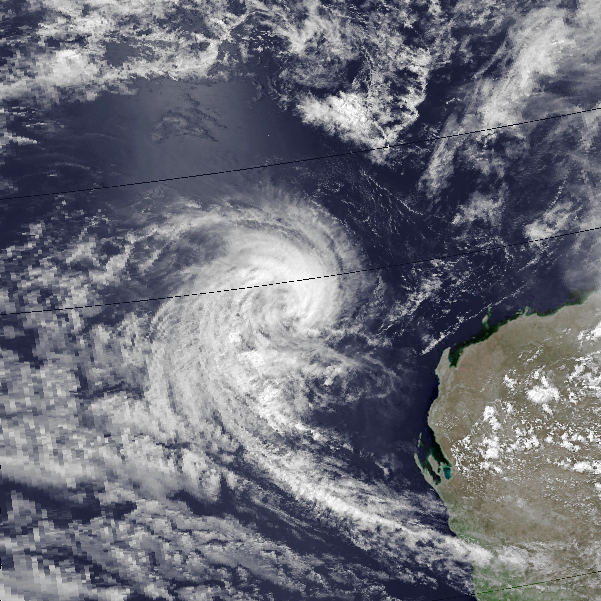
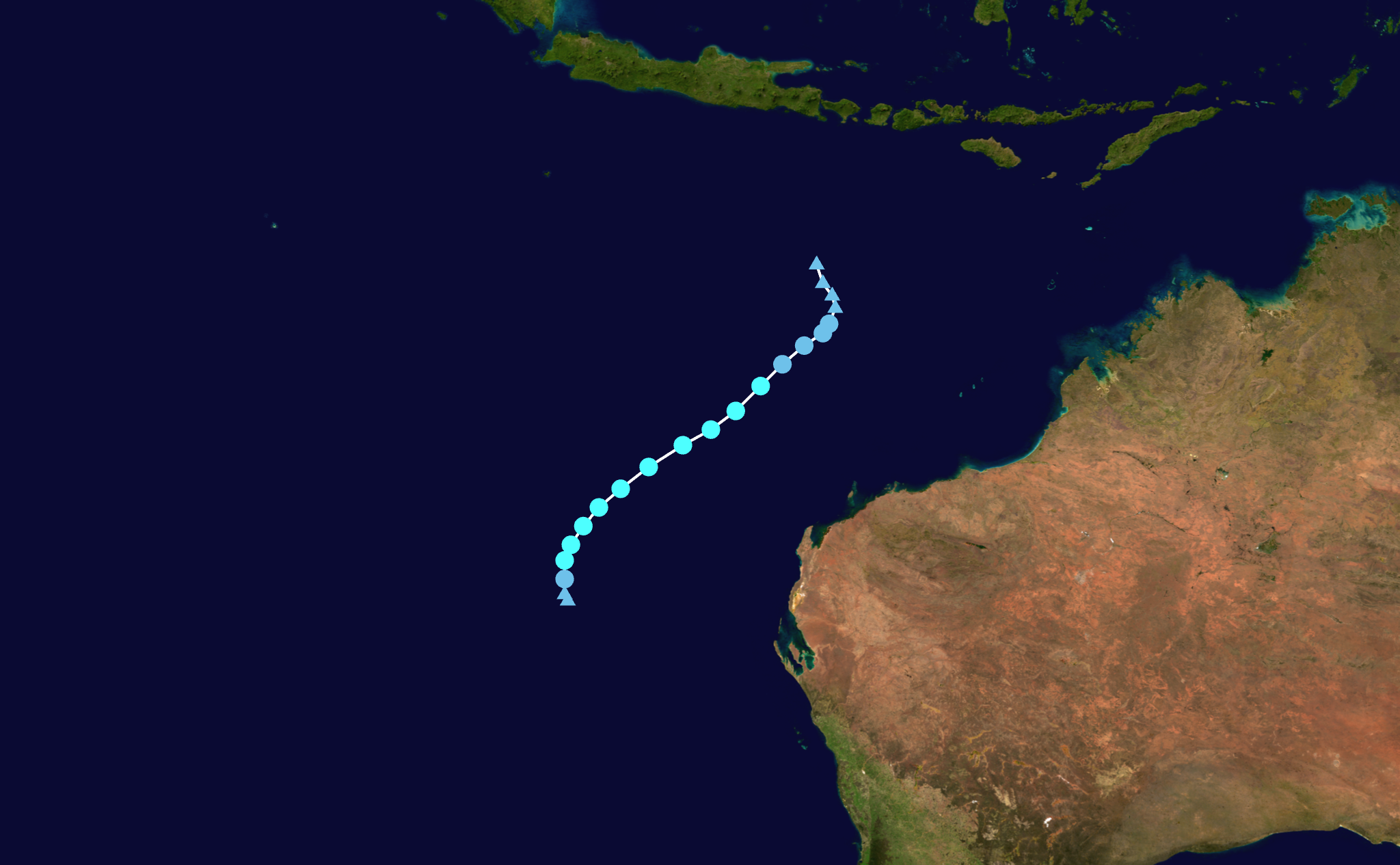
- Duration: 21 February – 26 February
- Peak intensity: 110 km/h (70 mph) (10-min); 980 hPa (mbar)

Tropical Cyclone Selwyn occurred from 21 February until 26 February 1986 and remained away from land in the Indian Ocean. Its estimated lowest pressure was 980 hPa.

=== Tropical Cyclone Tiffany ===
- Category 2 tropical cyclone (Australian scale)
- Tropical storm (SSHWS)
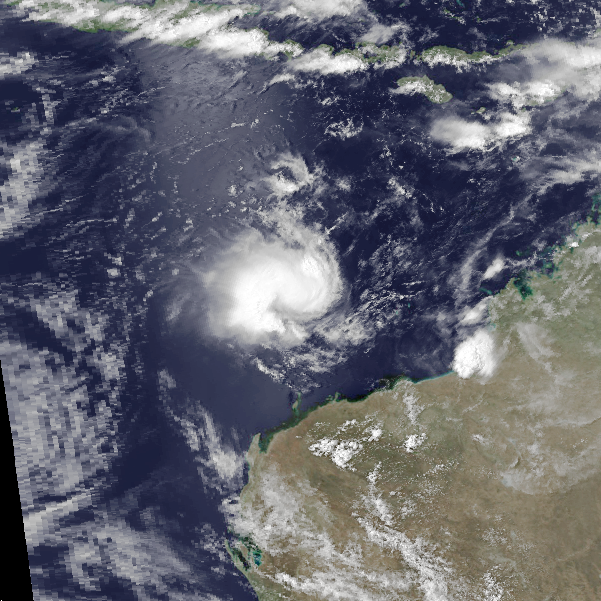
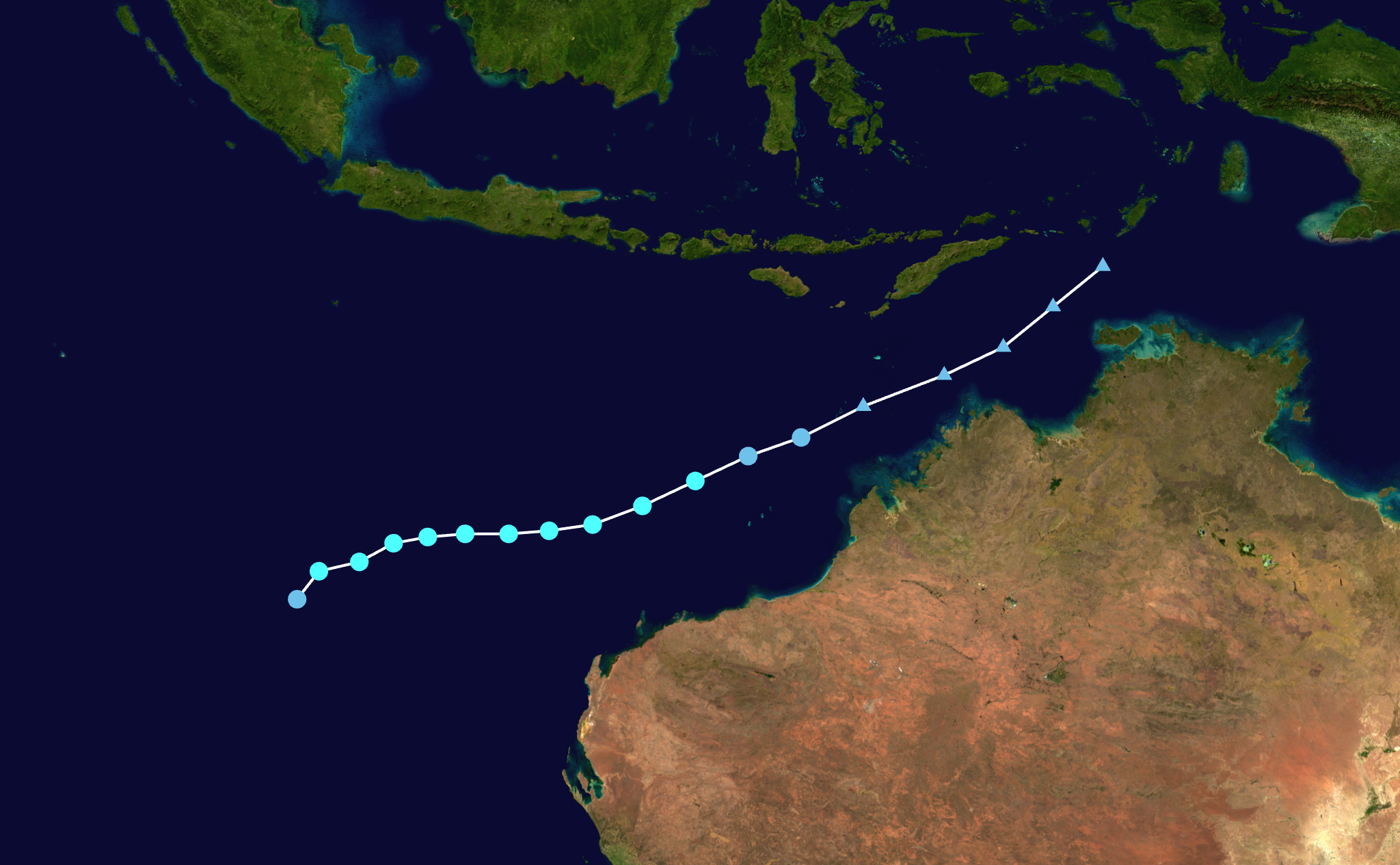
- Duration: 25 February – 1 March
- Peak intensity: 95 km/h (60 mph) (10-min); 984 hPa (mbar)

Tropical Cyclone Tiffany occurred from 25 February until 1 March 1986 and remained away from land in the Indian Ocean. Its estimated lowest pressure was 984 hPa.

=== Severe Tropical Cyclone Victor ===
- Category 4 severe tropical cyclone (Australian scale)
- Category 3 tropical cyclone (SSHWS)
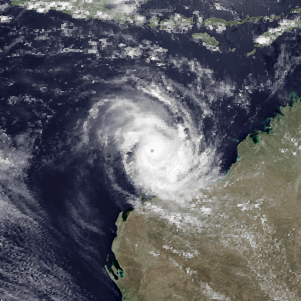
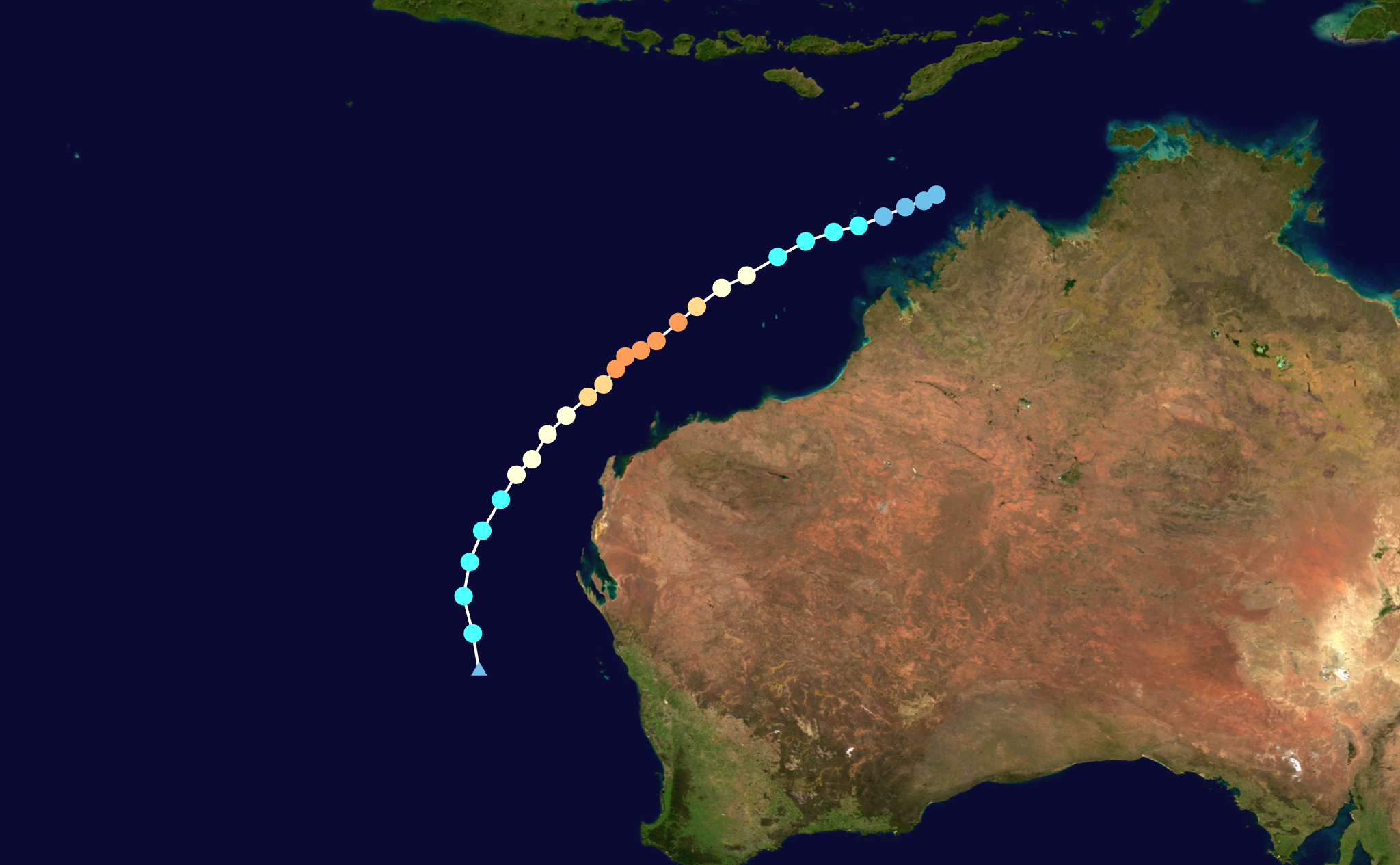
- Duration: 2 March – 9 March
- Peak intensity: 185 km/h (115 mph) (10-min); 930 hPa (mbar)

Tropical Cyclone Victor occurred from 2 March until 9 March 1986 and was the most severe cyclone of the Australian region for the season. It remained off the Western Australian coast for all its life. Its estimated lowest pressure was 930 hPa and highest gusts about 255 km/h.

=== Tropical Cyclone Alfred ===
- Category 1 tropical cyclone (Australian scale)
- Tropical storm (SSHWS)
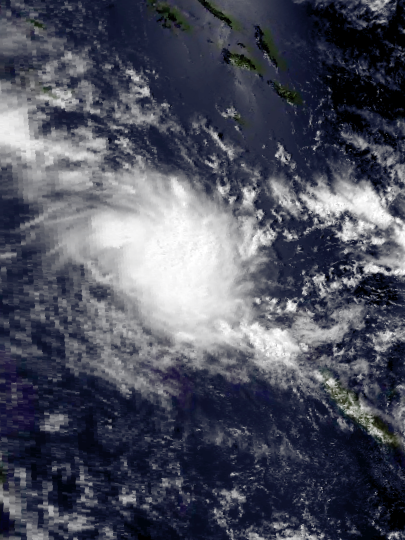
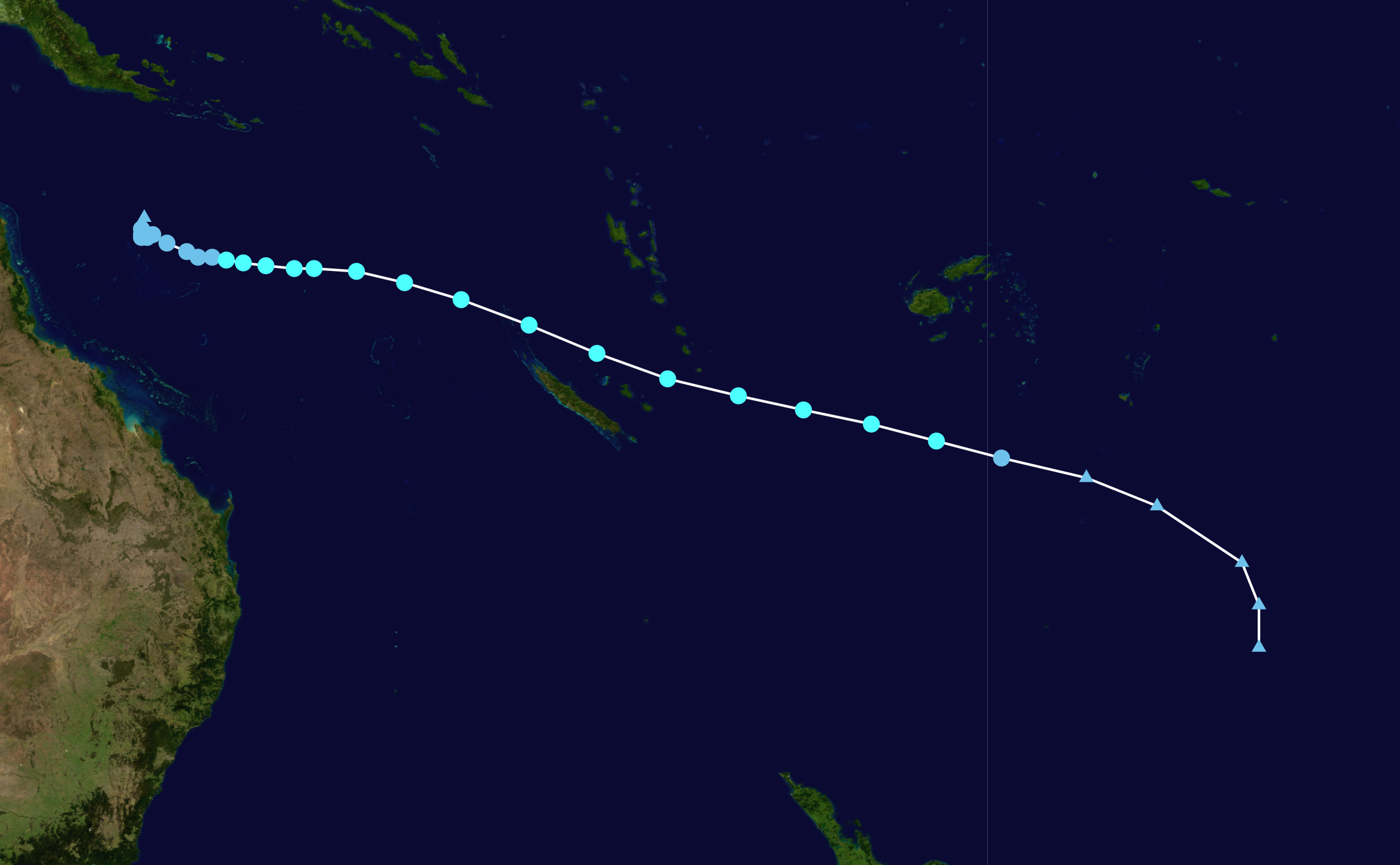
- Duration: 2 March – 7 March (Exited basin)
- Peak intensity: 75 km/h (45 mph) (10-min); 995 hPa (mbar)

=== Tropical Cyclone Alison–Krisostoma ===
- Category 2 tropical cyclone (Australian scale)
- Category 1 tropical cyclone (SSHWS)
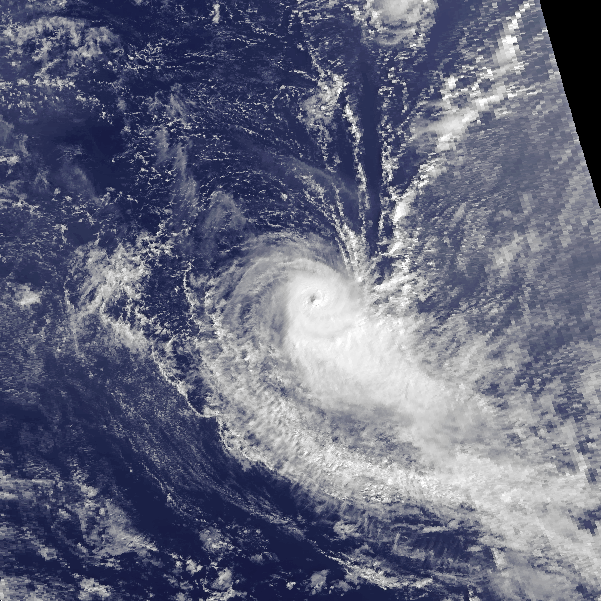
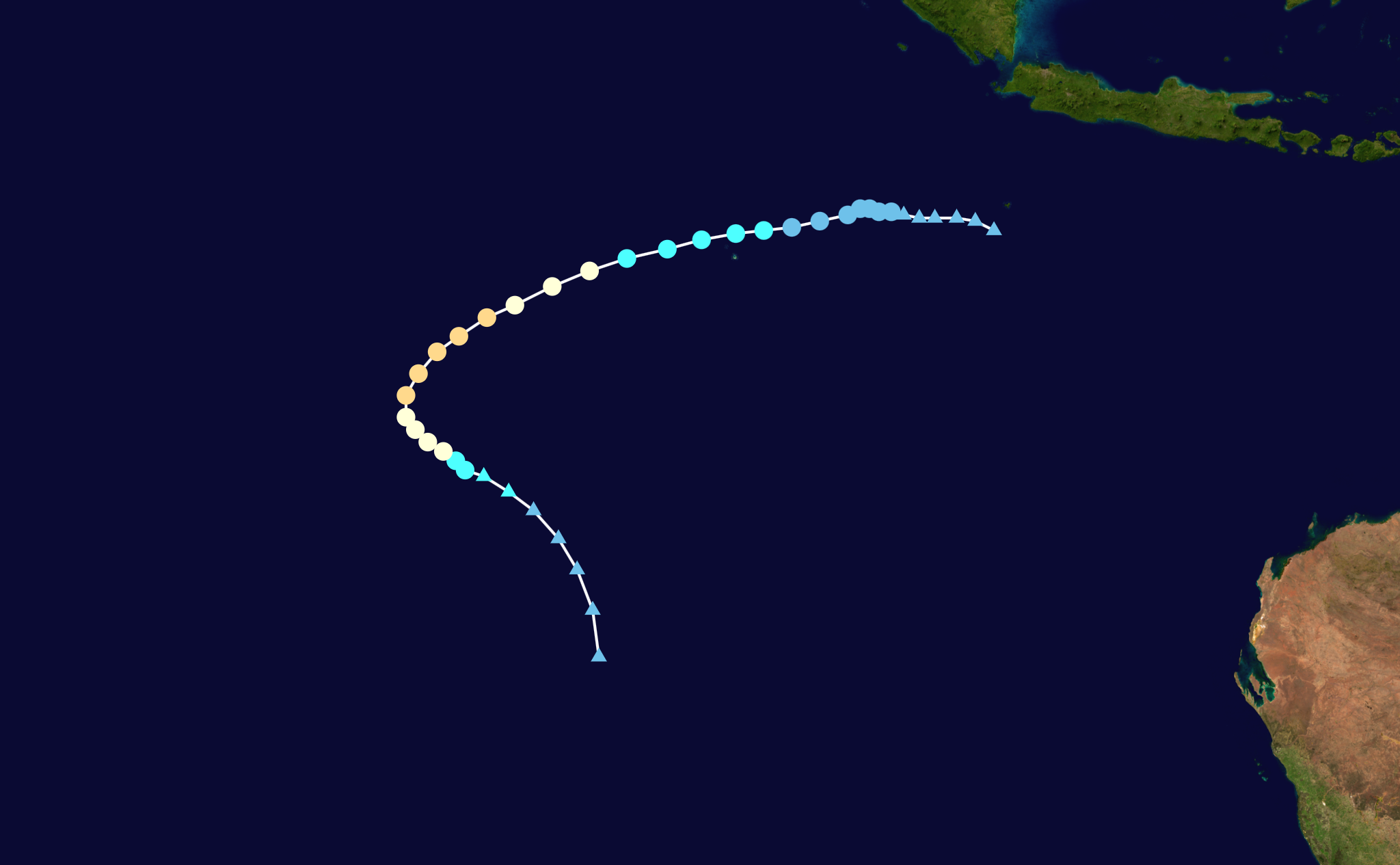
- Duration: 4 April – 9 April (Exited basin)
- Peak intensity: 100 km/h (65 mph) (10-min); 978 hPa (mbar)

Tropical Cyclone Alison occurred from 4 April until 14 April 1986 within the Indian Ocean. It moved westward into the Mauritius area of responsibility and was renamed Krisostoma. Its estimated lowest pressure was 974 hPa.

=== Severe Tropical Cyclone Manu ===
- Category 3 severe tropical cyclone (Australian scale)
- Category 1 tropical cyclone (SSHWS)
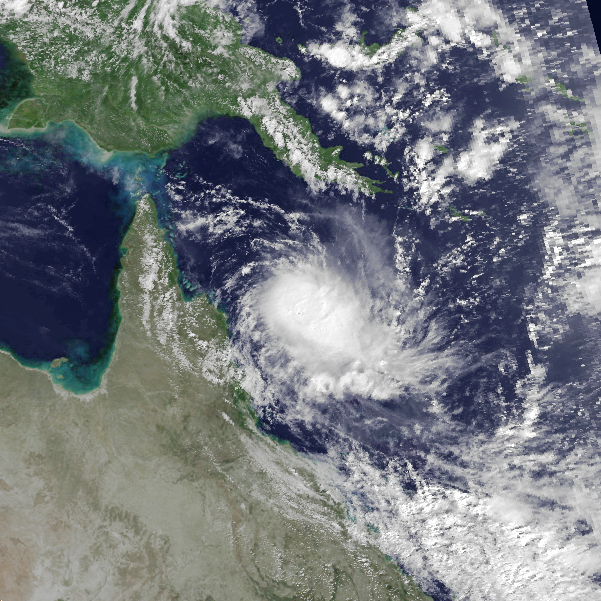
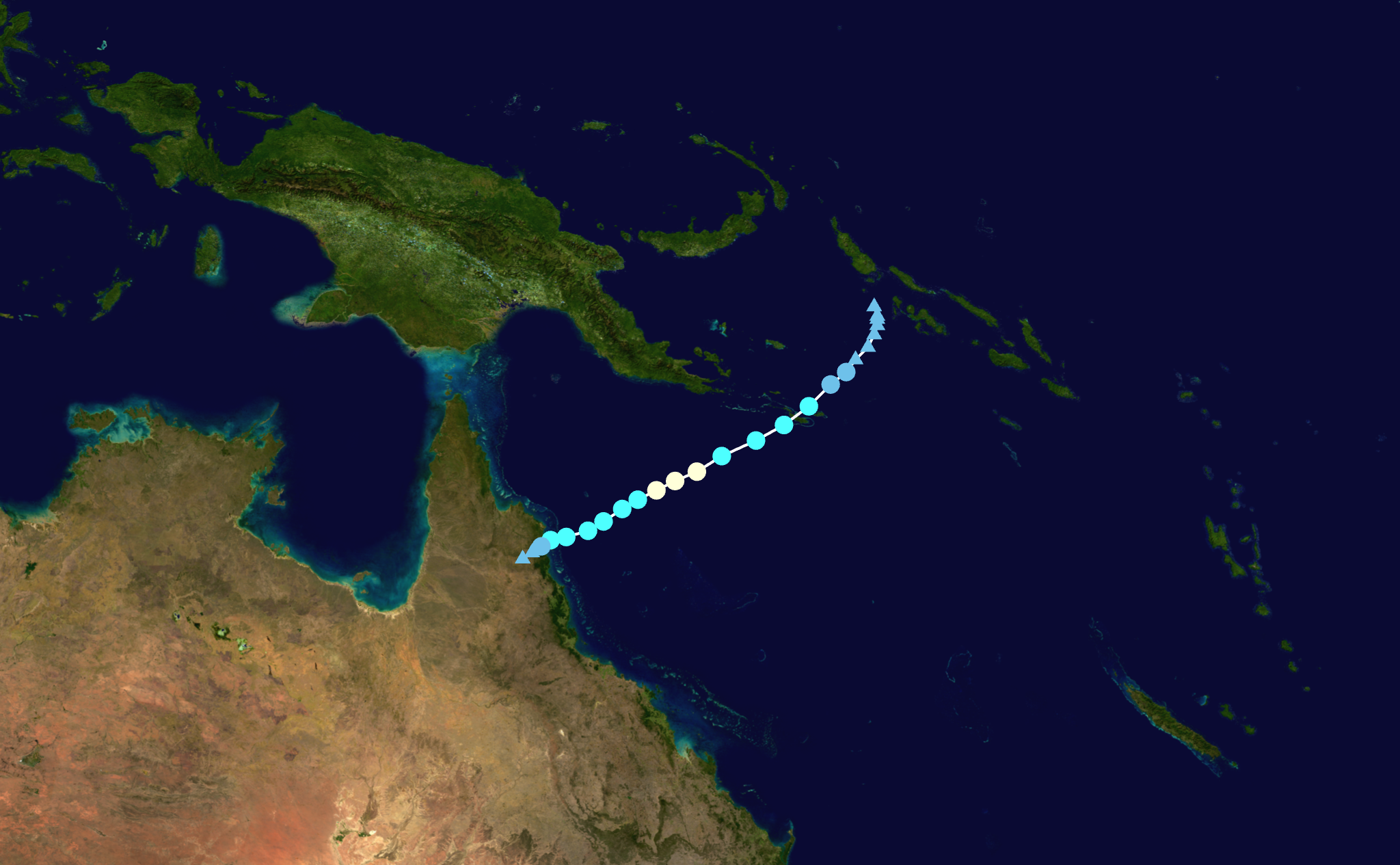
- Duration: 21 April – 27 April
- Peak intensity: 130 km/h (80 mph) (10-min); 970 hPa (mbar)

Tropical Cyclone Manu occurred from 21 April until 27 April 1986 off the Queensland coast. Its estimated lowest pressure was 970 hPa.

=== Severe Tropical Cyclone Billy–Lila ===
- Category 4 severe tropical cyclone (Australian scale)
- Category 3 tropical cyclone (SSHWS)
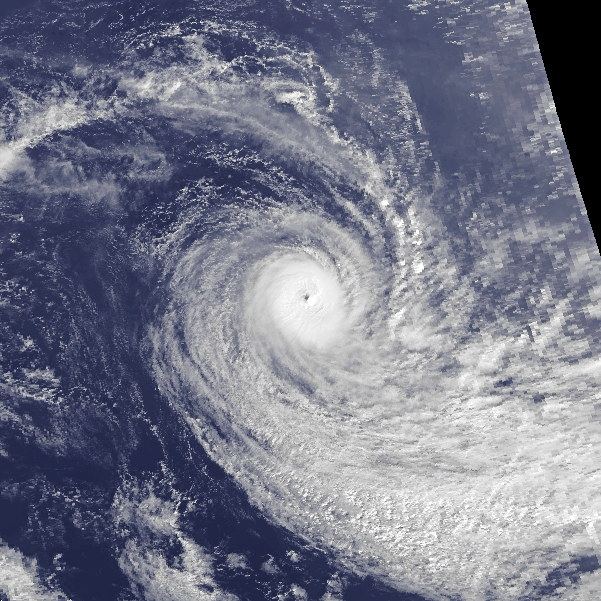
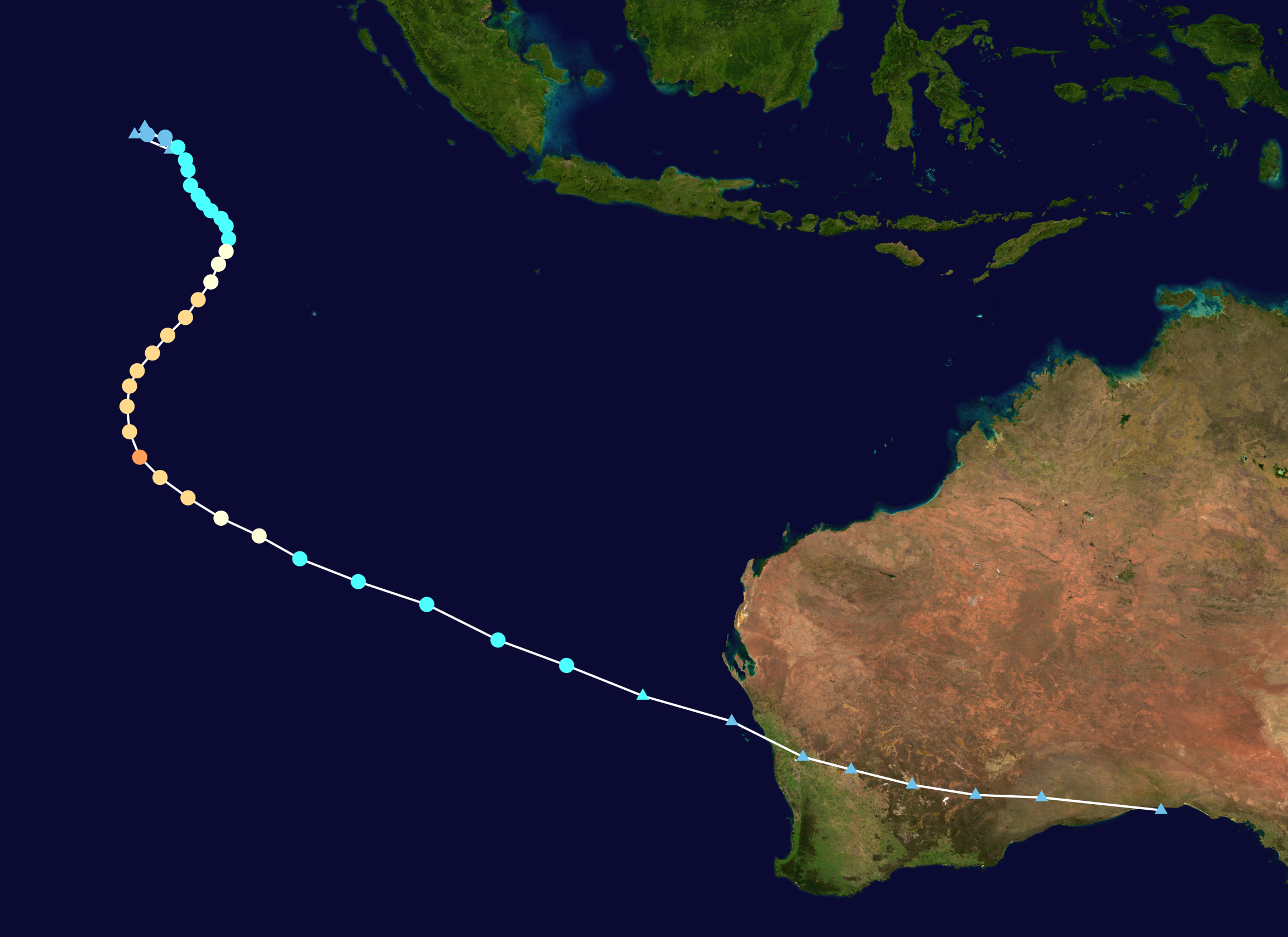
- Duration: 4 May (out of basin between 9–10 May) – 15 May
- Peak intensity: 165 km/h (105 mph) (10-min); 950 hPa (mbar)

Tropical Cyclone Billy occurred from 4 May until 15 May 1986. It temporarily moved west into the Mauritius area of responsibility where it was renamed Lila but then moved back again. It crossed the Western Australian coast near Geraldton just after dissipating. Its estimated lowest pressure was 950 hPa.

=== Severe Tropical Cyclone Namu ===
- Category 3 severe tropical cyclone (Australian scale)
- Category 2 tropical cyclone (SSHWS)
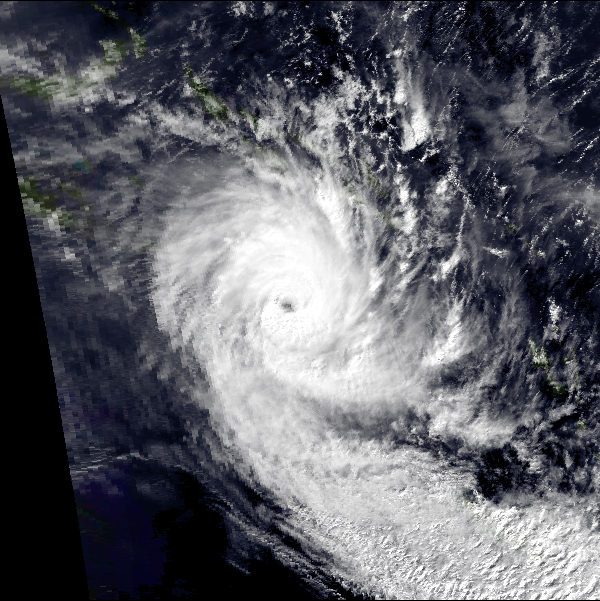
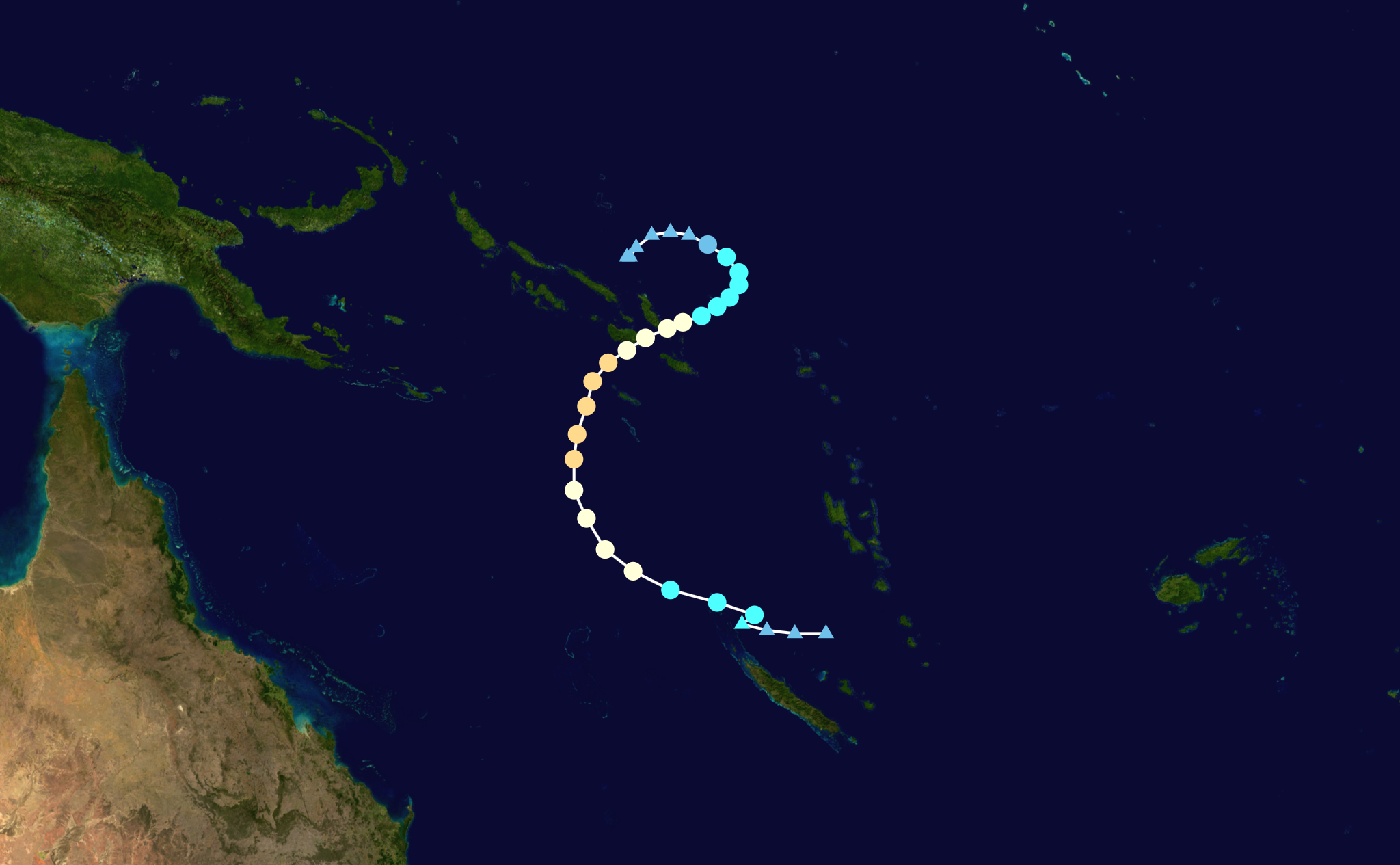
- Duration: 19 May (entered basin) – 21 May (exited basin)
- Peak intensity: 150 km/h (90 mph) (10-min); 960 hPa (mbar)

Cyclone Namu was responsible for the deaths of 103 people and caused US$100 million in economic losses in the Solomon Islands. It was considered the worst tropical cyclone to impact the area in five years. The storm was estimated to have caused a maximum wave height of 1.5 m (4.9 ft). Much of the damage caused by Namu was due to phenomenal flooding, and was widespread across the island chain. At Honiara International Airport, 340 mm (13 in) of rain was measured over a three-day period. Increased river flow caused by the depositing of saturated material in rivers was the cause for much of the flood damage that occurred. Of all the islands, Malaita was the worst affected by the cyclone. On the island of Guadalcanal, a single mudslide was responsible for killing 38 villagers. Attaining a clean water supply was issue on Guadalcanal, and 22% of homes on the island were either damaged or destroyed.

As a result of the havoc caused by the cyclone, approximately 90,000 people, equal to a third of the country's population, were reported as homeless. The government of the Solomon Islands declared a national state of emergency for the entirety of the island chain. The United Kingdom, Papua New Guinea, the United States, and Japan also sent supplies and goods to the Solomon Islands.

== See also ==
- Atlantic hurricane seasons: 1985, 1986
- Eastern Pacific hurricane seasons: 1985, 1986
- Western Pacific typhoon seasons: 1985, 1986
- North Indian Ocean cyclone seasons: 1985, 1986
