= 1985–86 South Pacific cyclone season =

Tropical cyclone season

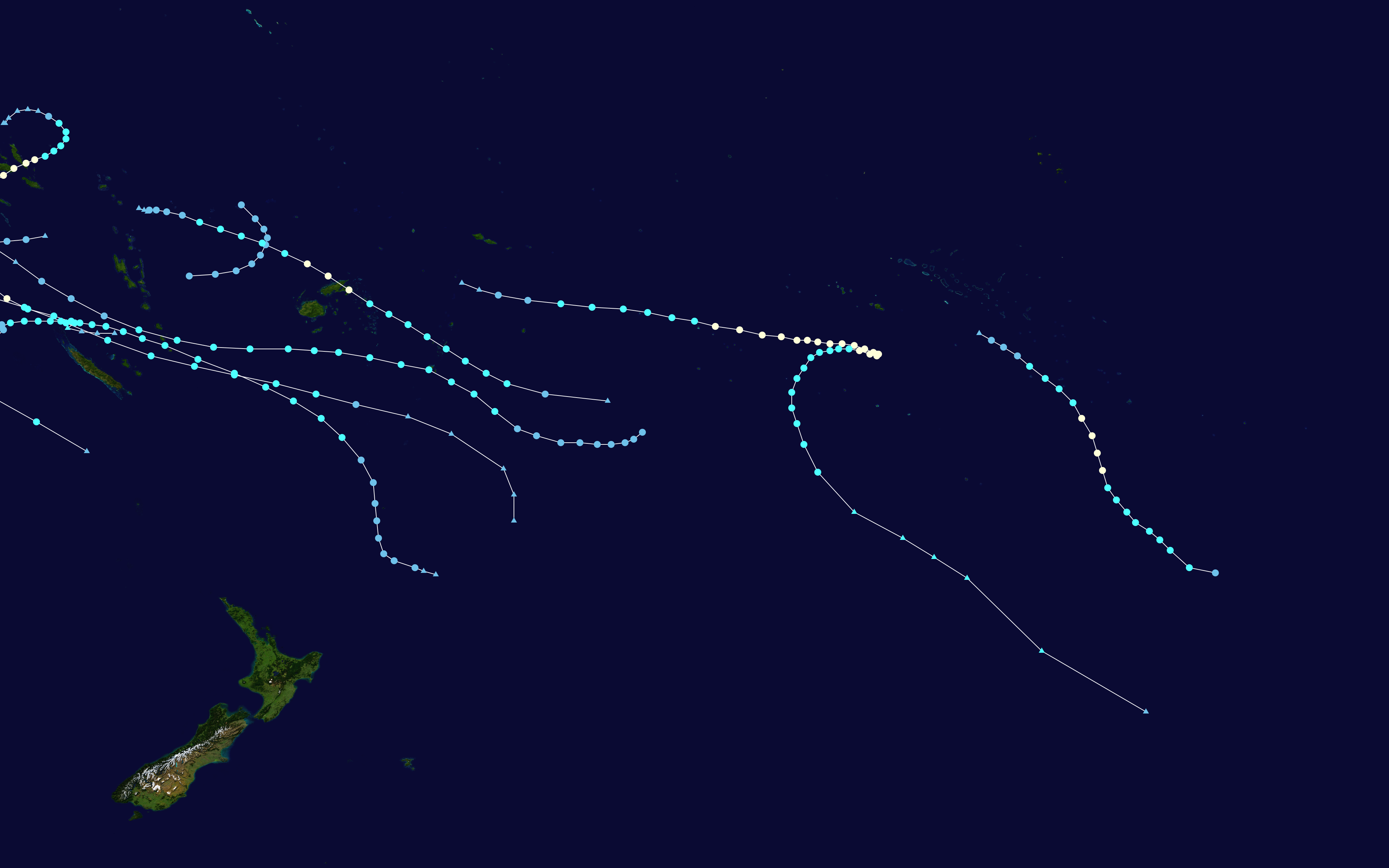
- Season summary map

Seasonal boundaries
- First system formed: February 5, 1986
- Last system dissipated: May 22, 1986

Strongest storm
- Name: Ima
  - Maximum winds: 165 km/h (105 mph) (10-minute sustained)
  - Lowest pressure: 940 hPa (mbar)

Seasonal statistics
- Total depressions: 7, 1 unofficial
- Tropical cyclones: 7
- Severe tropical cyclones: 3
- Total fatalities: >63
- Total damage: > $100 million (1985 USD)

Related articles
- 1985–86 South-West Indian Ocean cyclone season; 1985–86 Australian region cyclone season

The 1985–86 South Pacific cyclone season was an average tropical cyclone season, in terms of tropical cyclone formation, with ten tropical cyclones occurring within the basin between 160°E and 120°W. The season ran from February 5, 1985, to May 22, 1986, with tropical cyclones officially monitored by the Fiji Meteorological Service (FMS), Australian Bureau of Meteorology (BoM) and New Zealand's MetService. The United States Joint Typhoon Warning Center (JTWC) and other national meteorological services including Météo-France and NOAA also monitored the basin during the season. During the season there was nine tropical cyclones occurring within the basin, including three that moved into the basin from the Australian region.

== Seasonal summary ==
During November and December no significant tropical cyclones developed in or moved into the basin in the region,

== Systems ==
=== Severe Tropical Cyclone Ima ===
- Category 4 severe tropical cyclone (Australian scale)
- Category 1 tropical cyclone (SSHWS)
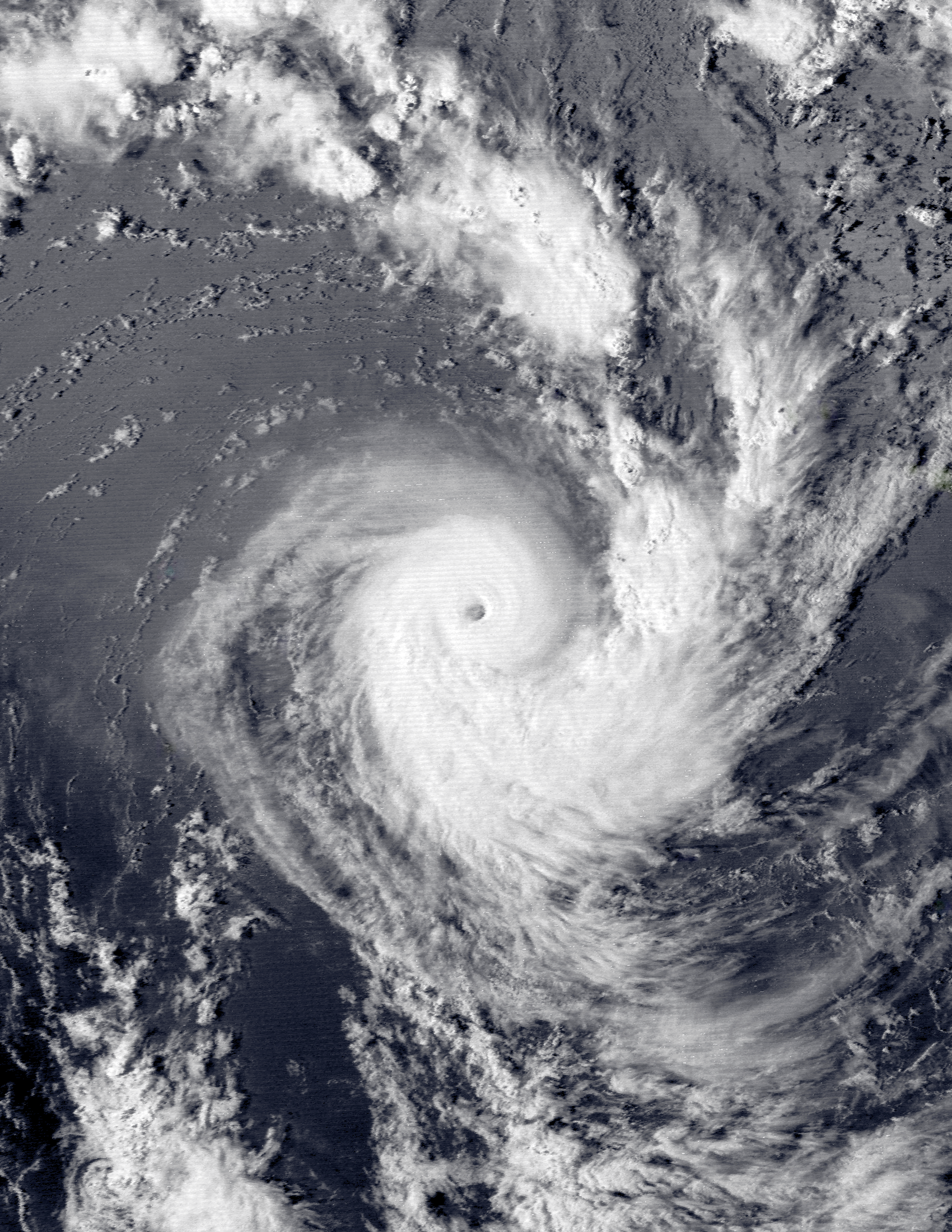
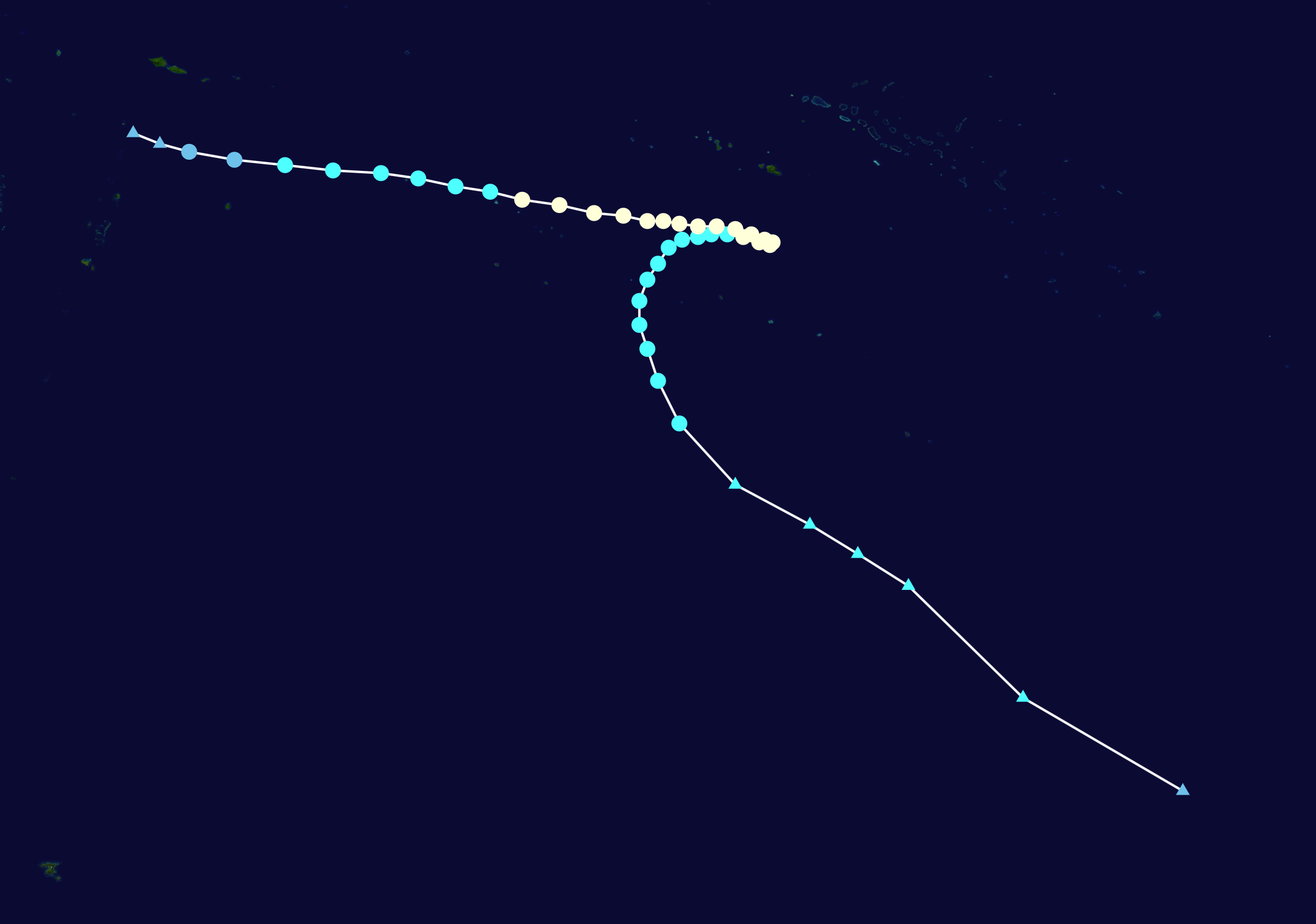
- Duration: February 5 – February 16
- Peak intensity: 165 km/h (105 mph) (10-min); 940 hPa (mbar)

Severe Tropical Cyclone Ima existed from February 5 to February 16.

Ima affected French Polynesia's Austral, Society and Tubuai Islands, from February 9–14 and caused extensive damage to Rimatara.

=== Tropical Cyclone June ===
- Category 2 tropical cyclone (Australian scale)
- Category 1 tropical cyclone (SSHWS)
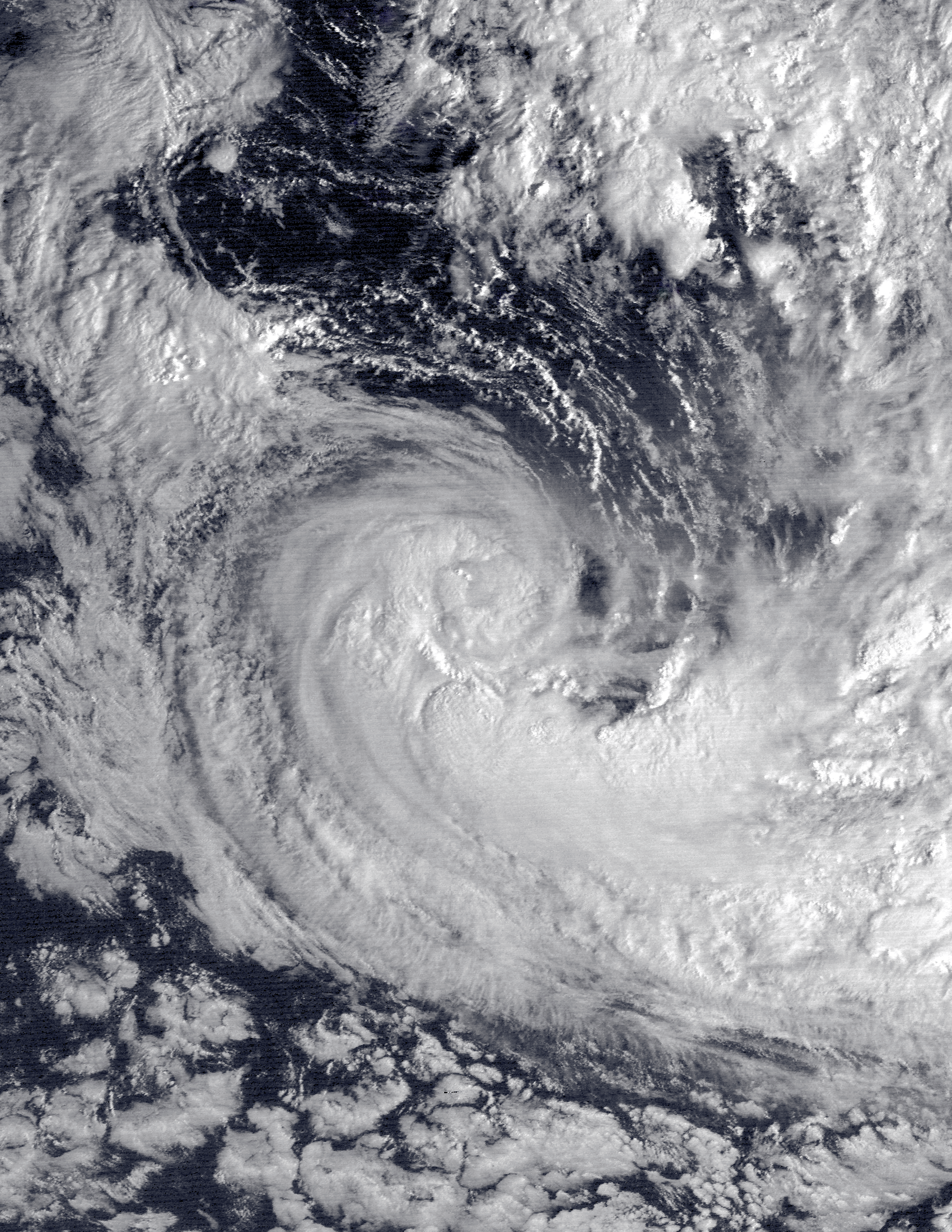
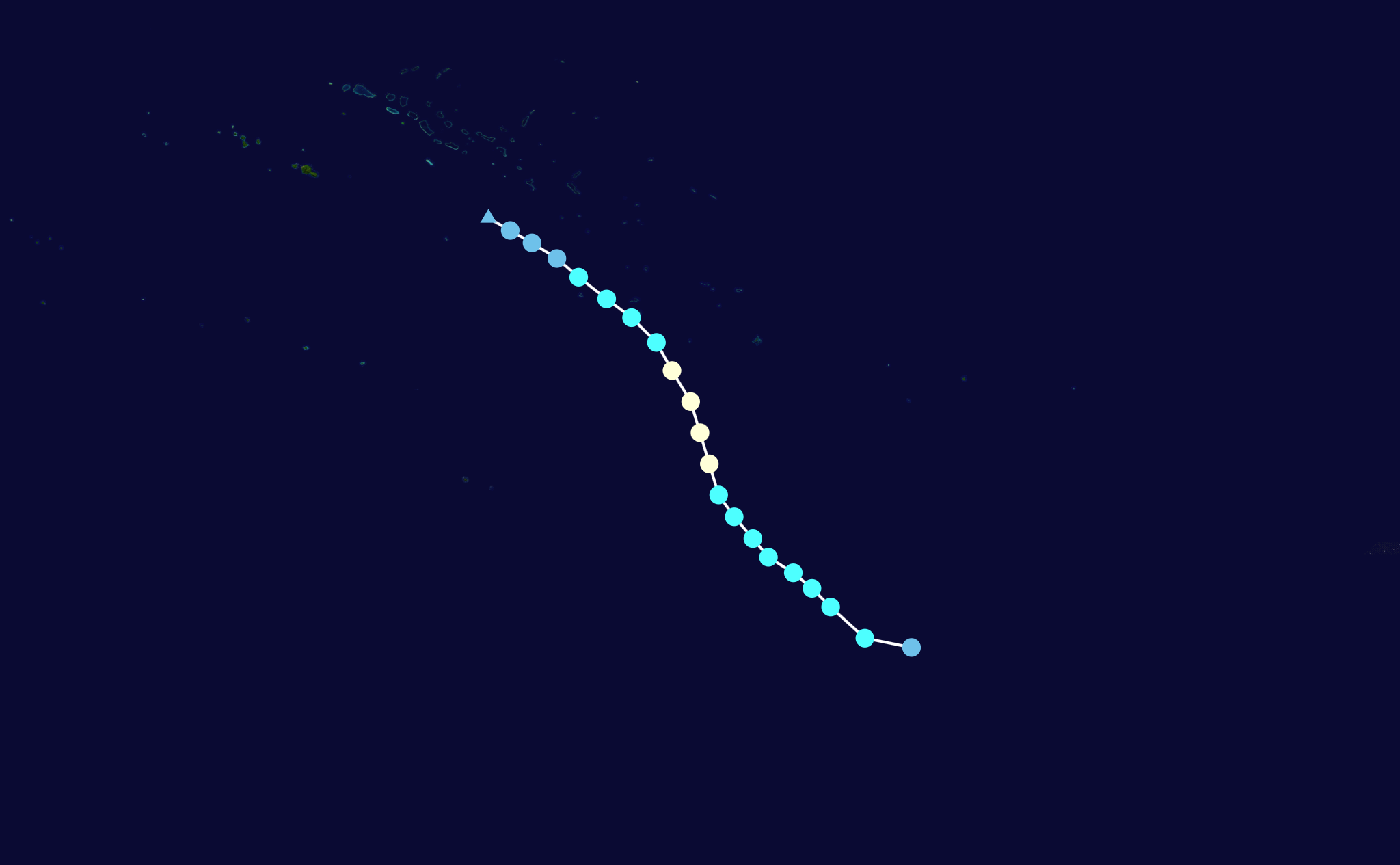
- Duration: February 5 – February 10
- Peak intensity: 100 km/h (65 mph) (10-min); 980 hPa (mbar)

On February 5, the FMS reported that a tropical depression had developed early on February 10. About 24 hours later, the system intensified into a Category 1 cyclone on the Australian intensity scale. Around that same time, the NPMOC followed suit by upgrading the system into a tropical storm. Gradually intensifying, the FMS estimated that June had peaked in intensity with winds of 65 mph (105 km/h) late on February 7. Meanwhile, the JTWC reported that Tropical Cyclone June had also peaked in intensity. By February 9, June had weakened into a tropical depression. June was no longer a tropical cyclone by the morning.

=== Tropical Cyclone Keli ===
- Category 1 tropical cyclone (Australian scale)
- Tropical storm (SSHWS)
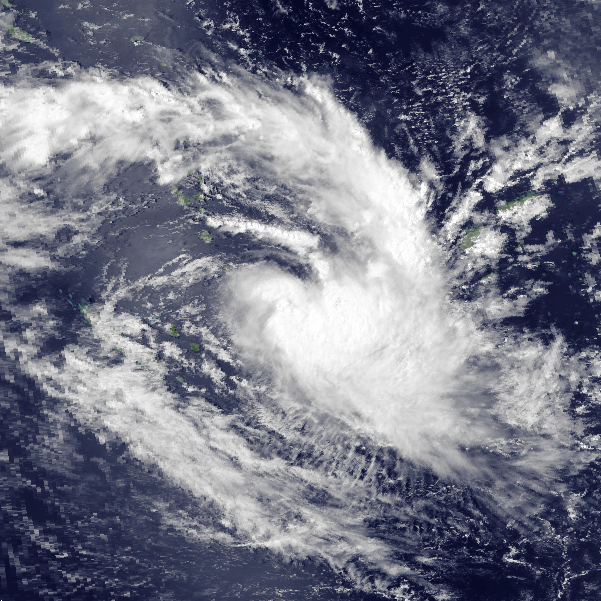
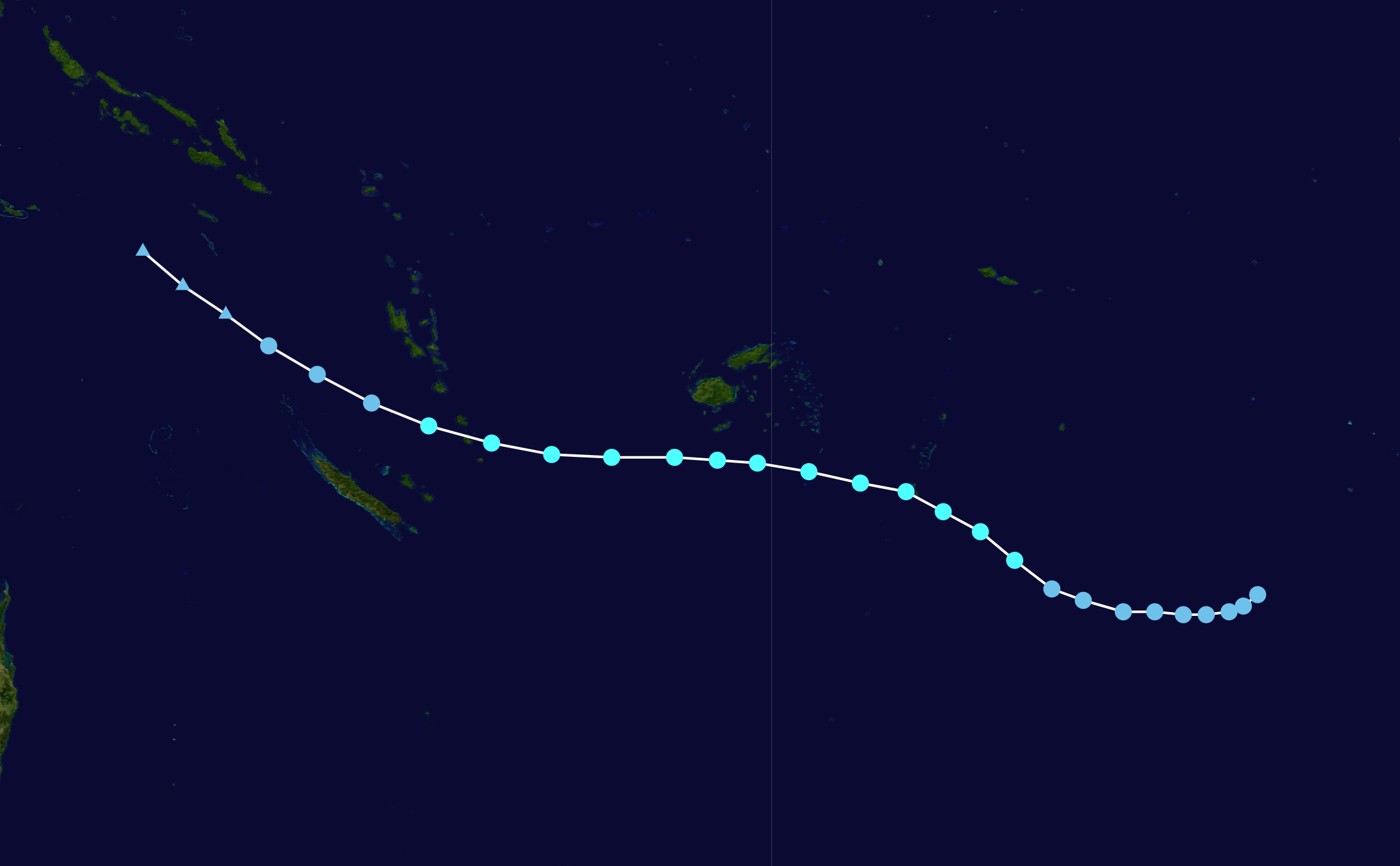
- Duration: February 8 – February 14
- Peak intensity: 85 km/h (50 mph) (10-min); 987 hPa (mbar)

Tropical Cyclone Keli existed from February 8 to February 14.

=== Tropical Cyclone Lusi ===
- Category 1 tropical cyclone (Australian scale)
- Tropical storm (SSHWS)
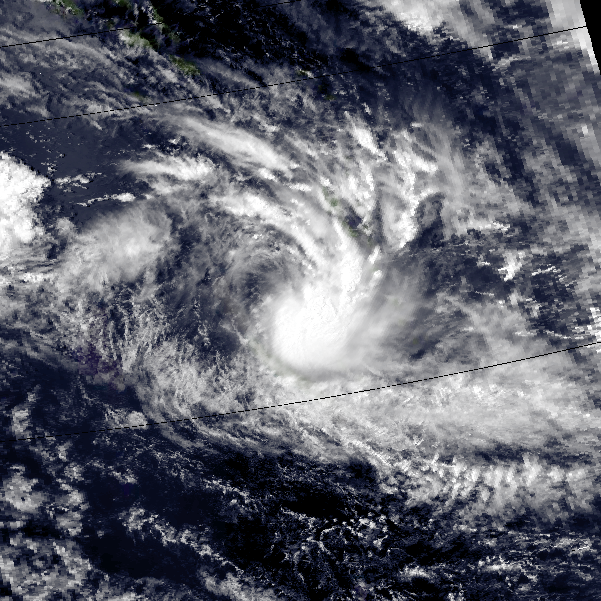
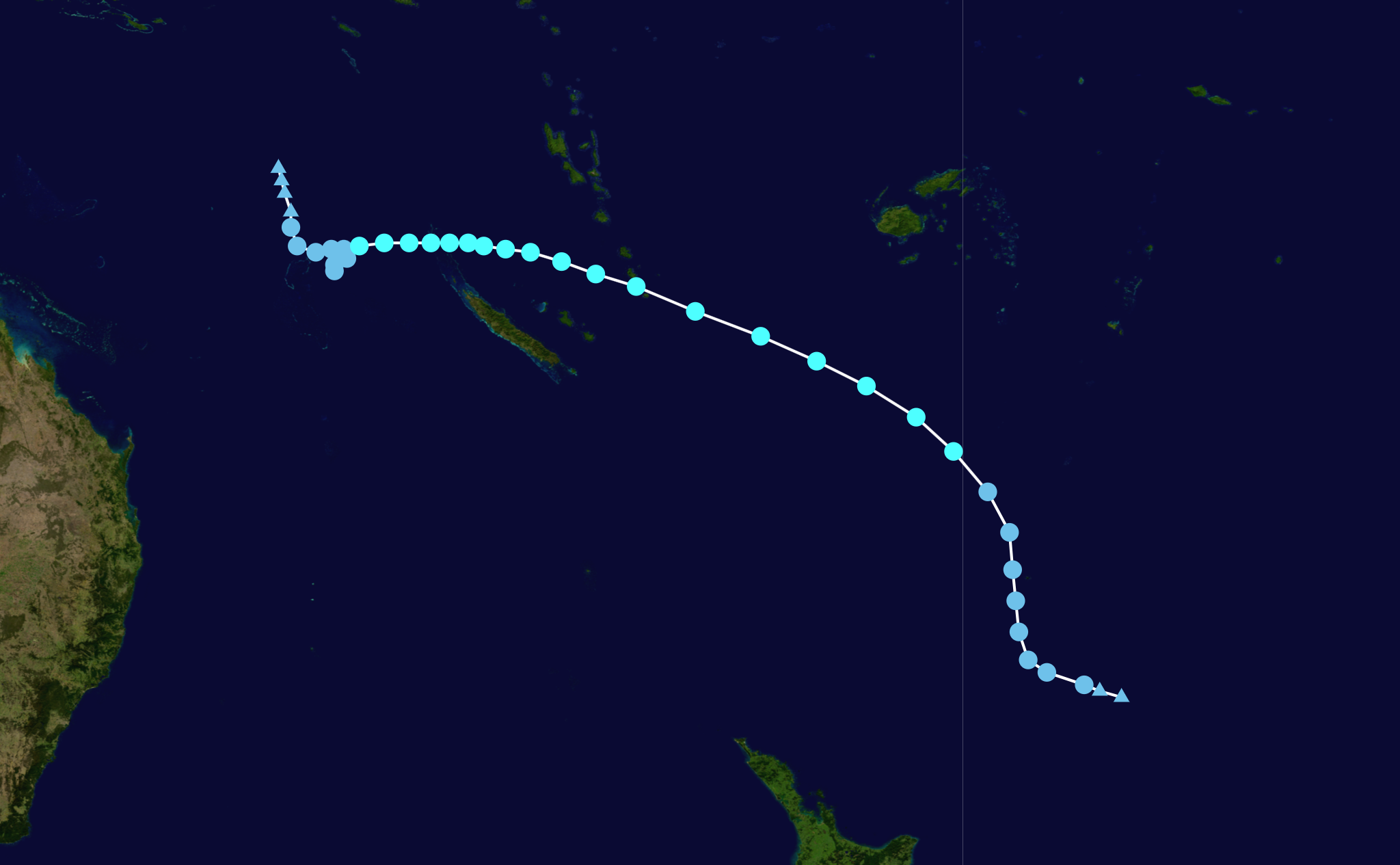
- Duration: March 2 – March 10
- Peak intensity: 75 km/h (45 mph) (10-min); 990 hPa (mbar)

According to the Vanuatu Meteorological Service, there was no significant damage reported within Vanuatu.

=== Tropical Cyclone Alfred ===
- Category 1 tropical cyclone (Australian scale)
- Tropical storm (SSHWS)
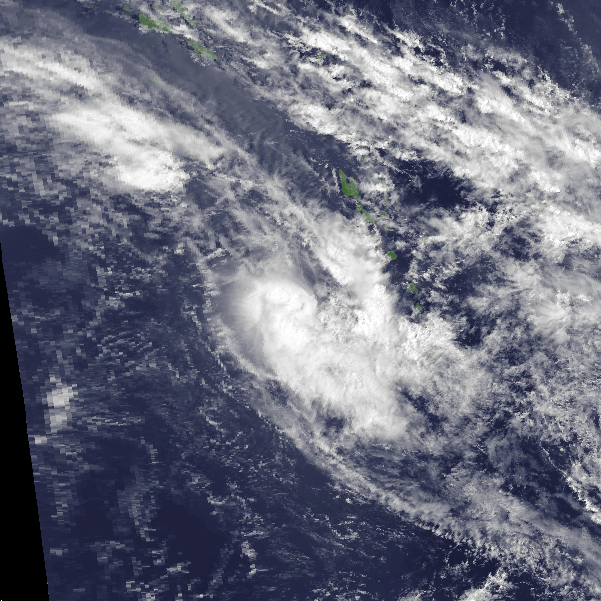
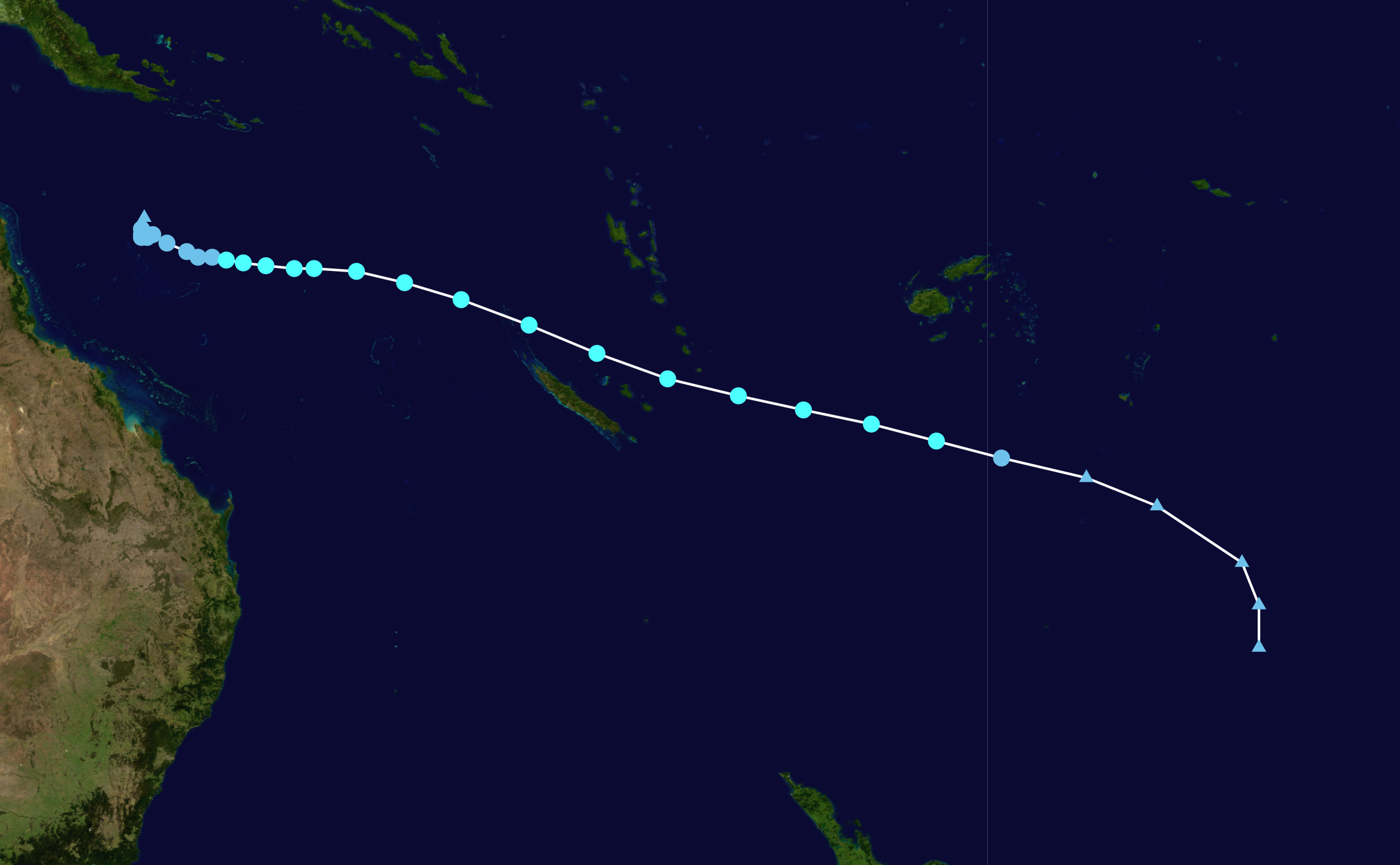
- Duration: March 7 (Entered basin) – March 11
- Peak intensity: 75 km/h (45 mph) (10-min); 990 hPa (mbar)

Tropical Cyclone Alfred existed from March 7 to March 11.

=== Severe Tropical Cyclone Martin ===
- Category 3 severe tropical cyclone (Australian scale)
- Category 1 tropical cyclone (SSHWS)
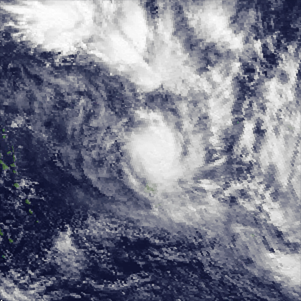
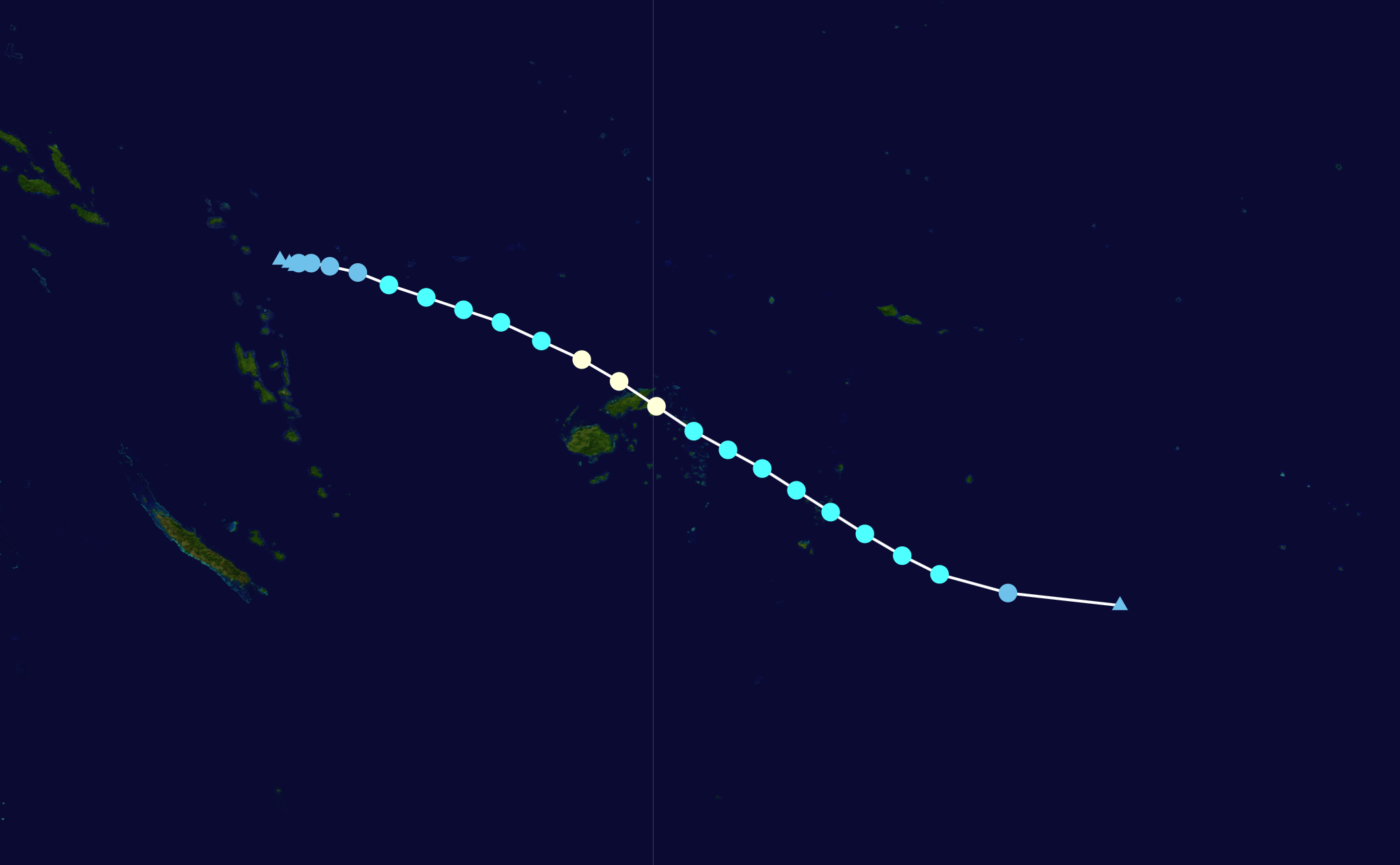
- Duration: April 10 – April 15
- Peak intensity: 120 km/h (75 mph) (10-min); 970 hPa (mbar)

Severe Tropical Cyclone Martin from April 10 to April 15.

=== Severe Tropical Cyclone Namu ===
- Category 3 severe tropical cyclone (Australian scale)
- Category 1 tropical cyclone (SSHWS)
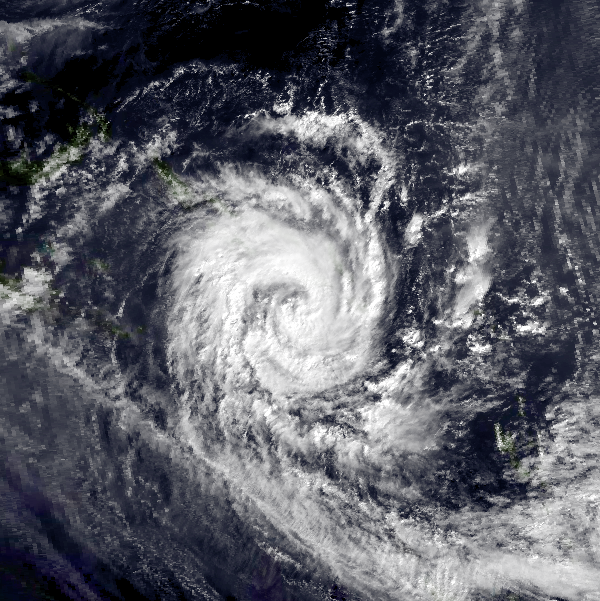
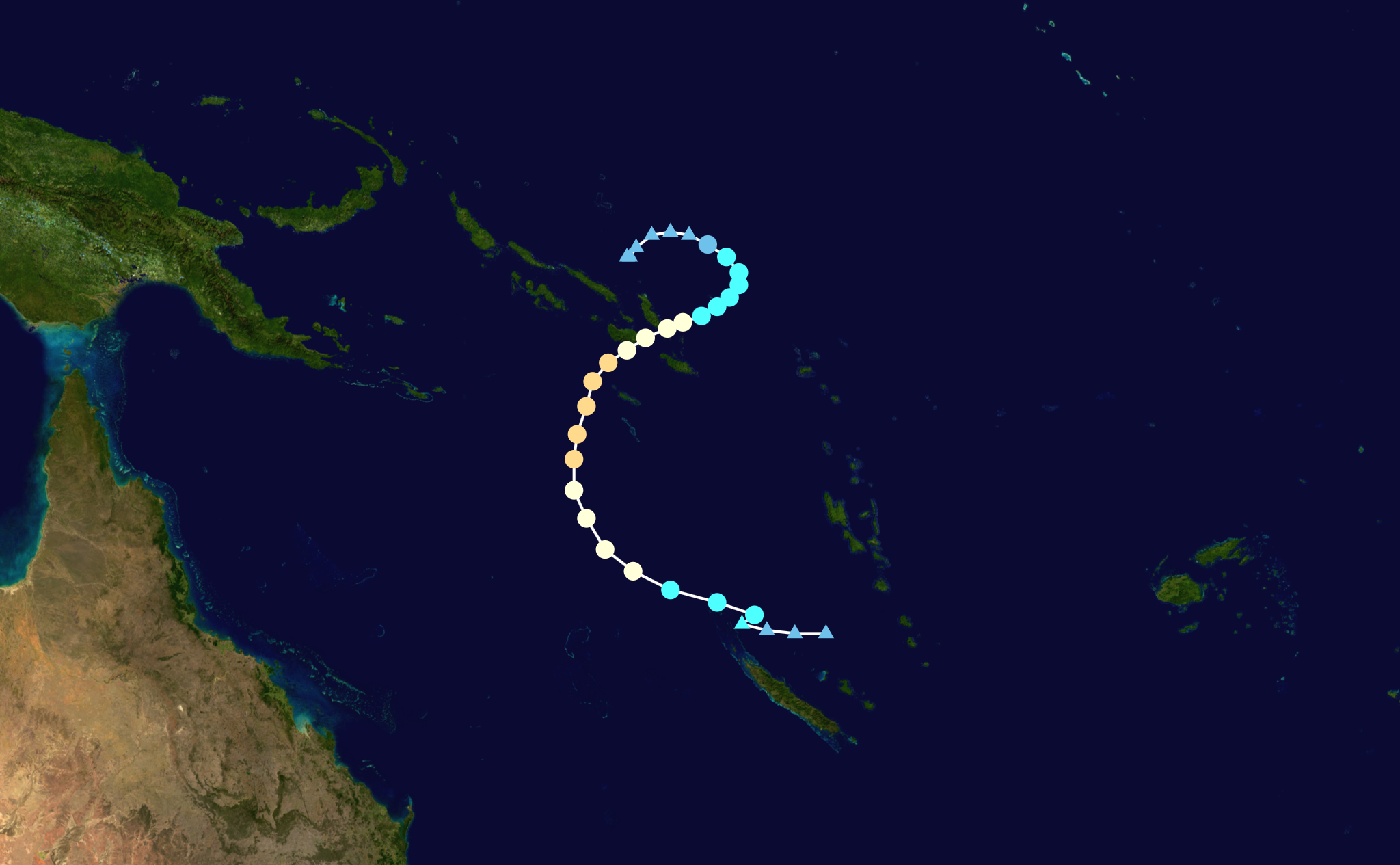
- Duration: May 15 – May 23 (out of basin from May 19-21)
- Peak intensity: 150 km/h (90 mph) (10-min); 955 hPa (mbar)

On May 15, TCWC Nadi started to monitor a tropical depression that had developed within the monsoon trough, in association with Typhoon Lola about 90 km (55 mi) to the north of the Solomon Island: Malaita. Over the next two days the system moved towards the southeast before it recurved, and started to move towards the southwest during May 17 as it started to show signs that it was developing further. After the system had acquired the characteristics of a tropical cyclone and become equivalent to a tropical storm, the United States Joint Typhoon Warning Center started to issue warnings on the system and designated it as Tropical Cyclone 33P. Later that day, TCWC Nadi named the depression Namu, after it had become equivalent to a modern-day category-two tropical cyclone on the Australian tropical cyclone intensity scale with ten-minute sustained windspeeds of 155 km/h (95 mph).

Cyclone Namu was responsible for the deaths of 103 people and caused US$100 million in economic losses in the Solomon Islands. It was considered the worst tropical cyclone to impact the area in five years. The storm was estimated to have caused a maximum wave height of 1.5 m (4.9 ft). Much of the damage caused by Namu was due to phenomenal flooding, and was widespread across the island chain. At Honiara International Airport, 340 mm (13 in) of rain was measured over a three-day period. Increased river flow caused by the depositing of saturated material in rivers was the cause for much of the flood damage that occurred. Of all the islands, Malaita was the worst affected by the cyclone. On the island of Guadalcanal, a single mudslide was responsible for killing 38 villagers. Attaining a clean water supply was an issue on Guadalcanal, and 22% of homes on the island were either damaged or destroyed.

As a result of the havoc caused by the cyclone, approximately 90,000 people, equal to a third of the country's population, were reported as homeless. The government of the Solomon Islands declared a national state of emergency for the entirety of the island chain. The United Kingdom, Papua New Guinea, the United States, and Japan also sent supplies and goods to the Solomon Islands.

== Season effects ==
This table lists all the storms that developed in the South Pacific basin during the 1985–86 season. It includes their intensity on the Australian Tropical cyclone intensity scale, duration, name, areas affected, deaths, and damages. For most storms the data is taken from TCWC Nadi's and or TCWC Wellington's archives, however data for 03P has been taken from the JTWC/NPMOC archives as opposed to TCWC Nadi's or TCWC Wellington's, and thus the winds are over 1-minute as opposed to 10-minutes.

Name	Dates	Peak intensity			Areas affected	Damage (USD)	Deaths	Refs
Name	Dates	Category	Wind speed	Pressure	Areas affected	Damage (USD)	Deaths	Refs
Ima	February 5 – 16	Category 4 severe tropical cyclone	165 km/h (105 mph)	940 hPa (27.76 inHg)	Cook Islands	None	None	
June	February 5–10	Category 2 tropical cyclone	100 km/h (65 mph)	980 hPa (28.94 inHg)		None	None	
Keli	February 8–14	Category 1 tropical cyclone	85 km/h (50 mph)	987 hPa (29.15 inHg)		None	None	
Lusi	March 2–10	Category 1 tropical cyclone	75 km/h (45 mph)	990 hPa (29.23 inHg)	Vanuatu	None	None	
Alfred	March 7–11	Category 1 tropical cyclone	75 km/h (45 mph)	990 hPa (29.23 inHg)	Vanuatu	None	None	
Martin	April 10–15	Category 3 severe tropical cyclone	120 km/h (75 mph)	970 hPa (28.64 inHg)		None	None	
Namu	May 16–22	Category 3 severe tropical cyclone	150 km/h (95 mph)	955 hPa (28.20 inHg)	Solomon Islands	$100 million	63 - 150	
Season aggregates
7 systems	February 5 – May 22		165 km/h (105 mph)	940 hPa (27.76 inHg)		>$100 million	103	
