= 1986 hurricane season =

1986 hurricane season may refer to:

- The 1986 Atlantic hurricane season
- The 1986 Pacific hurricane season
