= 1986 North Indian Ocean cyclone season =

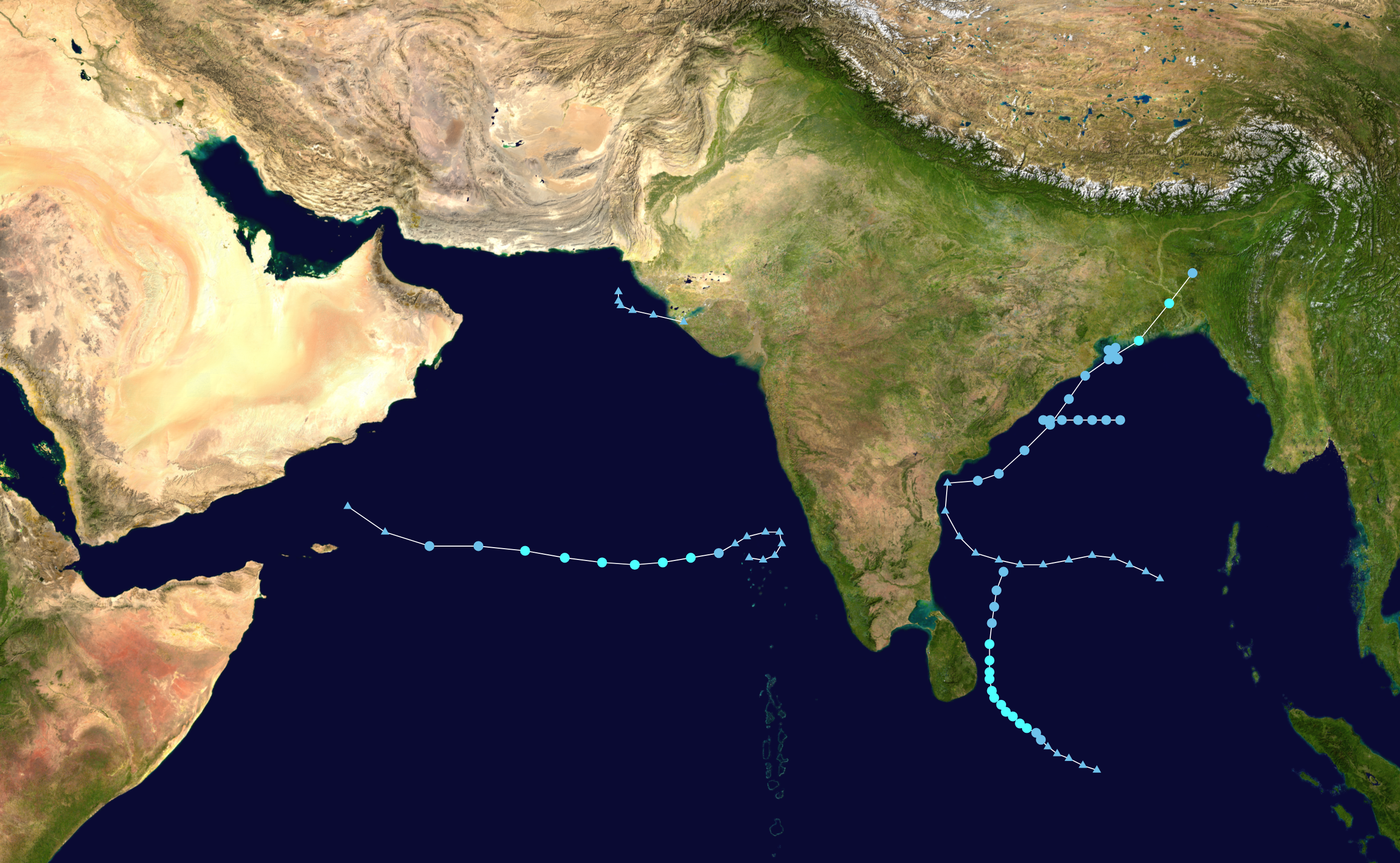
- Season summary map

Seasonal boundaries
- First system formed: January 7, 1986
- Last system dissipated: November 11, 1986

Strongest storm
- Name: Two
  - Maximum winds: 85 km/h (50 mph) (3-minute sustained)

Seasonal statistics
- Depressions: 7
- Deep depressions: 3
- Cyclonic storms: 1 (record low)
- Total fatalities: 11
- Total damage: Unknown

Related articles
- 1986 Atlantic hurricane season; 1986 Pacific hurricane season; 1986 Pacific typhoon season

The 1986 North Indian Ocean cyclone season was the least active year on record for the basin in terms of cyclonic storms, with only one forming during the season, beating the previous record set in 1983. The season has no official bounds but cyclones tend to form between April and December. These dates conventionally delimit the period of each year when most tropical cyclones form in the northern Indian Ocean. There are two main seas in the North Indian Ocean—the Bay of Bengal to the east of the Indian subcontinent and the Arabian Sea to the west of India. The official Regional Specialized Meteorological Centre in this basin is the India Meteorological Department (IMD), while the Joint Typhoon Warning Center (JTWC) releases unofficial advisories. An average of five tropical cyclones form in the North Indian Ocean every season with peaks in May and November. Cyclones occurring between the meridians 45°E and 100°E are included in the season by the IMD.

== Systems ==
=== Deep Depression BOB 01 ===
- Deep depression (IMD)
- Tropical storm (SSHWS)
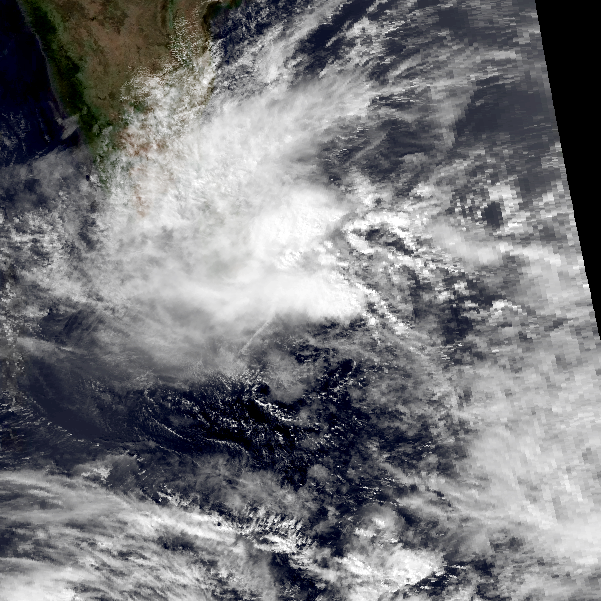
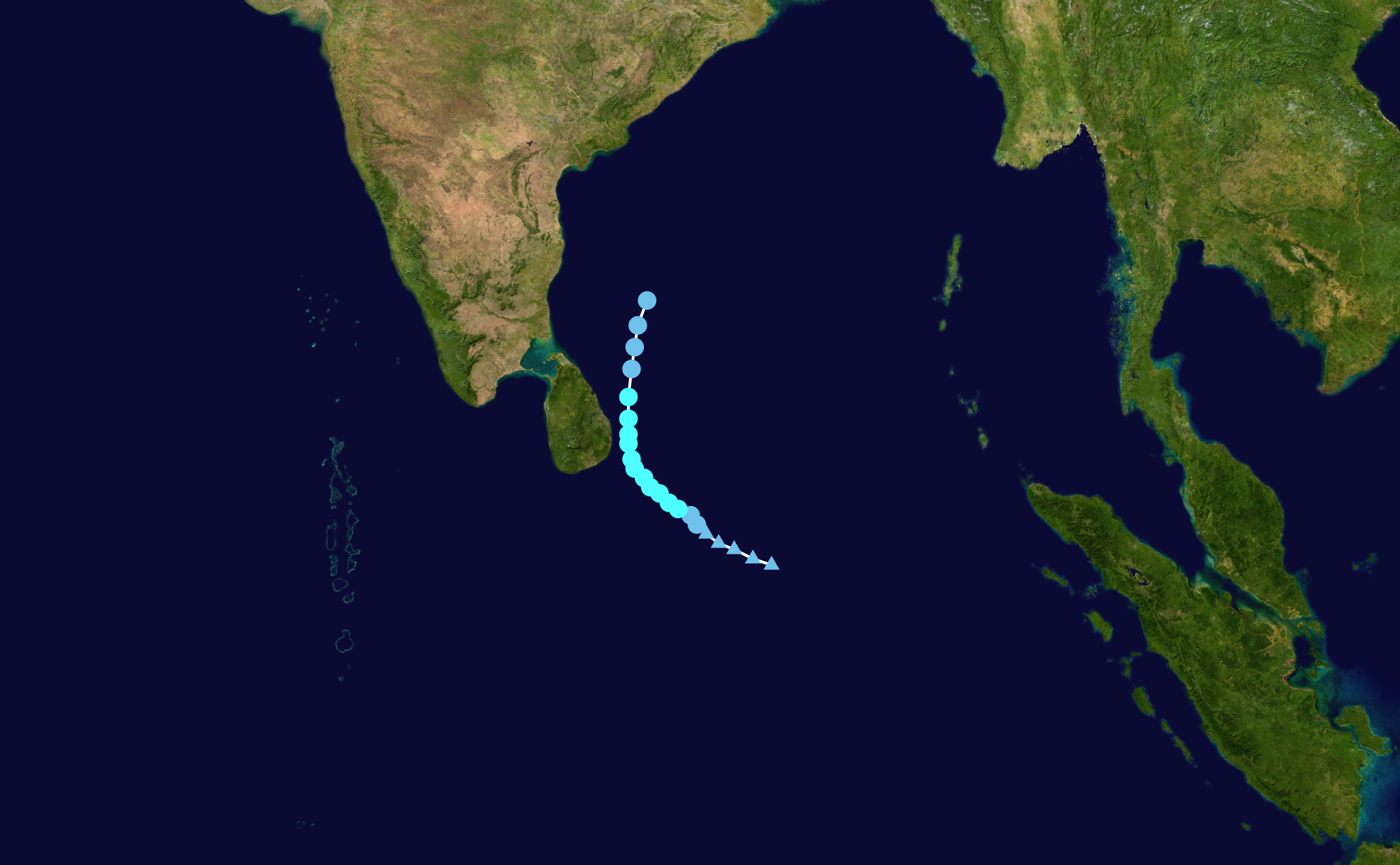
- Duration: January 7 – January 11
- Peak intensity: 55 km/h (35 mph) (3-min);

Tropical Depression 1B developed southeast of Sri Lanka on January 7. It tracked northwestward, briefly strengthening to a 50 mph tropical storm before upper-level winds caused it to dissipate on the 11th.

=== Cyclonic Storm BOB 05 ===
- Cyclonic storm (IMD)
- Tropical storm (SSHWS)
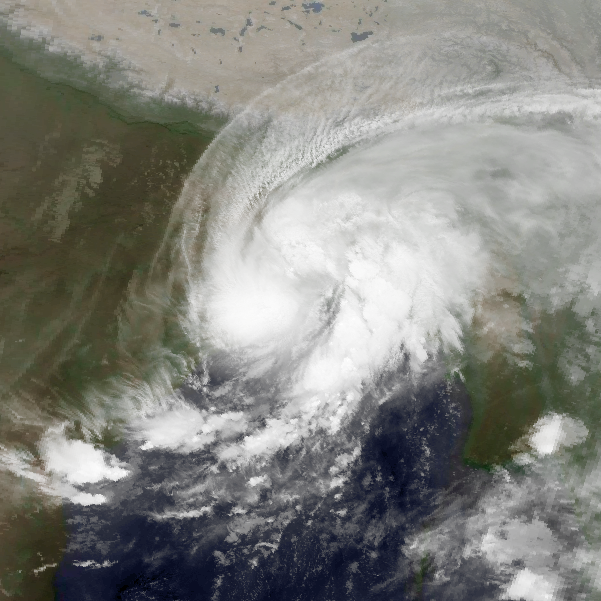
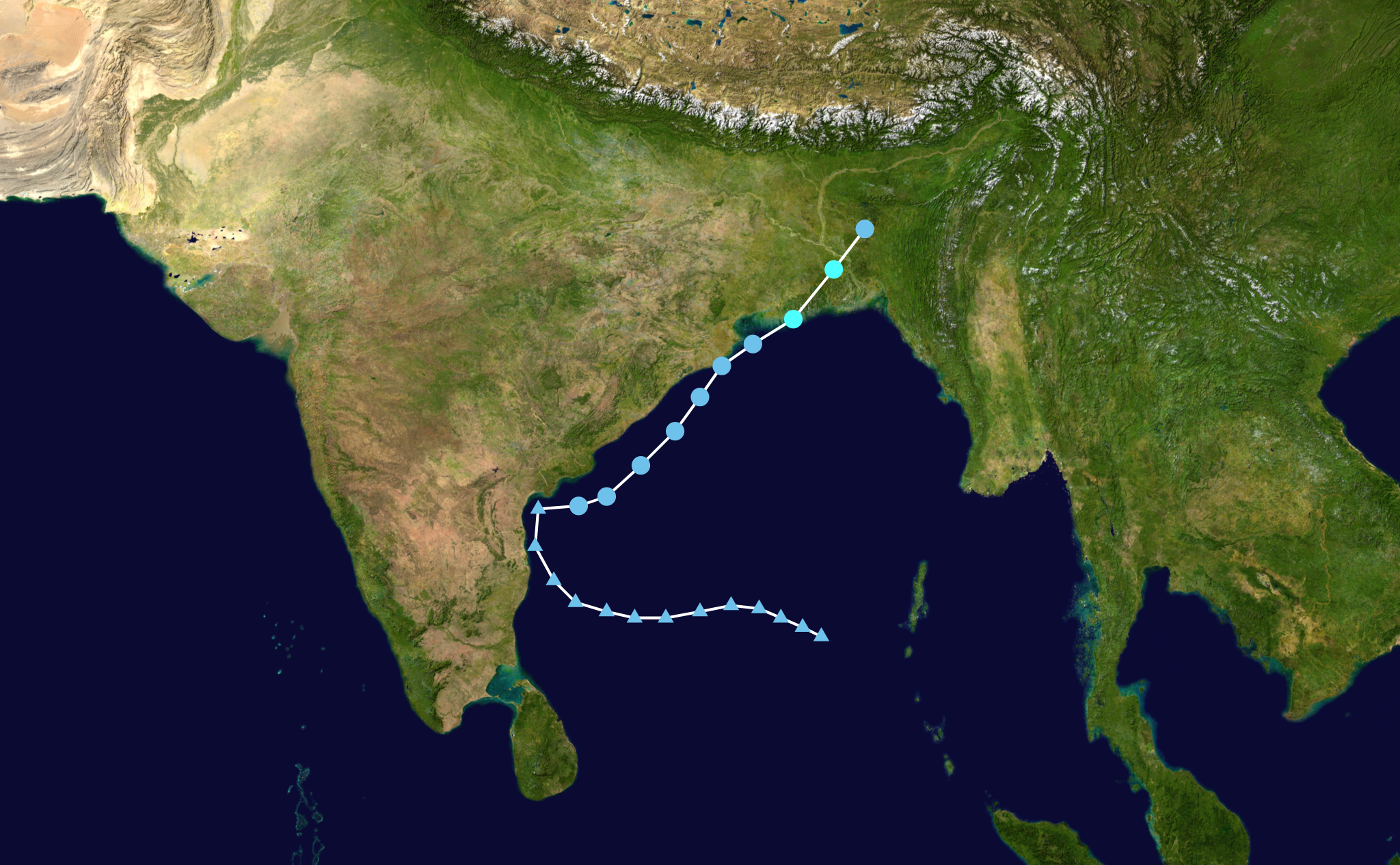
- Duration: November 6 – November 10
- Peak intensity: 85 km/h (50 mph) (3-min);

A tropical disturbance slowly organized into a tropical depression on November 6 in the Bay of Bengal. It turned to the northeast, became a tropical storm, and reached a peak of 60 mph winds before hitting Bangladesh on the 9th. The storm dissipated on the 10th, after causing 11 casualties and heavy damage.

=== Deep Depression ARB 02 ===
- Deep depression (IMD)
- Tropical storm (SSHWS)
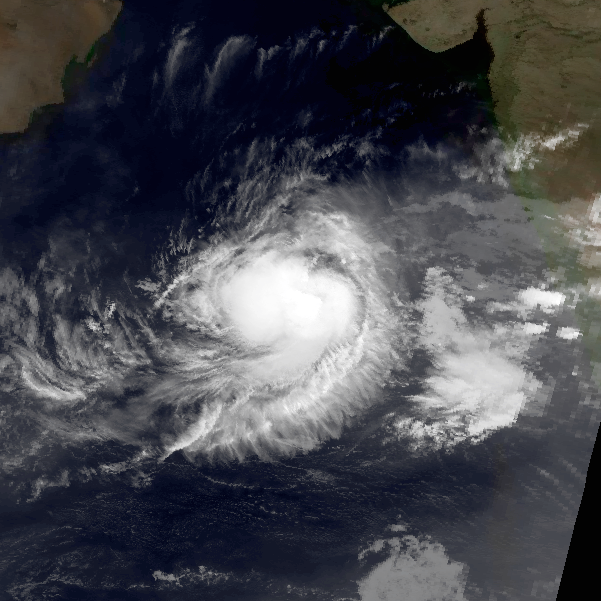
- Duration: November 9 – November 11
- Peak intensity: 55 km/h (35 mph) (3-min);

From November 9 to the 11th, Tropical Storm Three existed over the open Arabian Sea, dissipating due to vertical shear.

== See also ==
- North Indian Ocean tropical cyclone
- 1986 Atlantic hurricane season
- 1986 Pacific hurricane season
- 1986 Pacific typhoon season
- Australian cyclone seasons: 1985–86, 1986–87
- South Pacific cyclone seasons: 1985–86, 1986–87
- South-West Indian Ocean cyclone seasons: 1985–86, 1986–87
