= Hurricane Charley (1986) =

Category 1 Atlantic hurricane

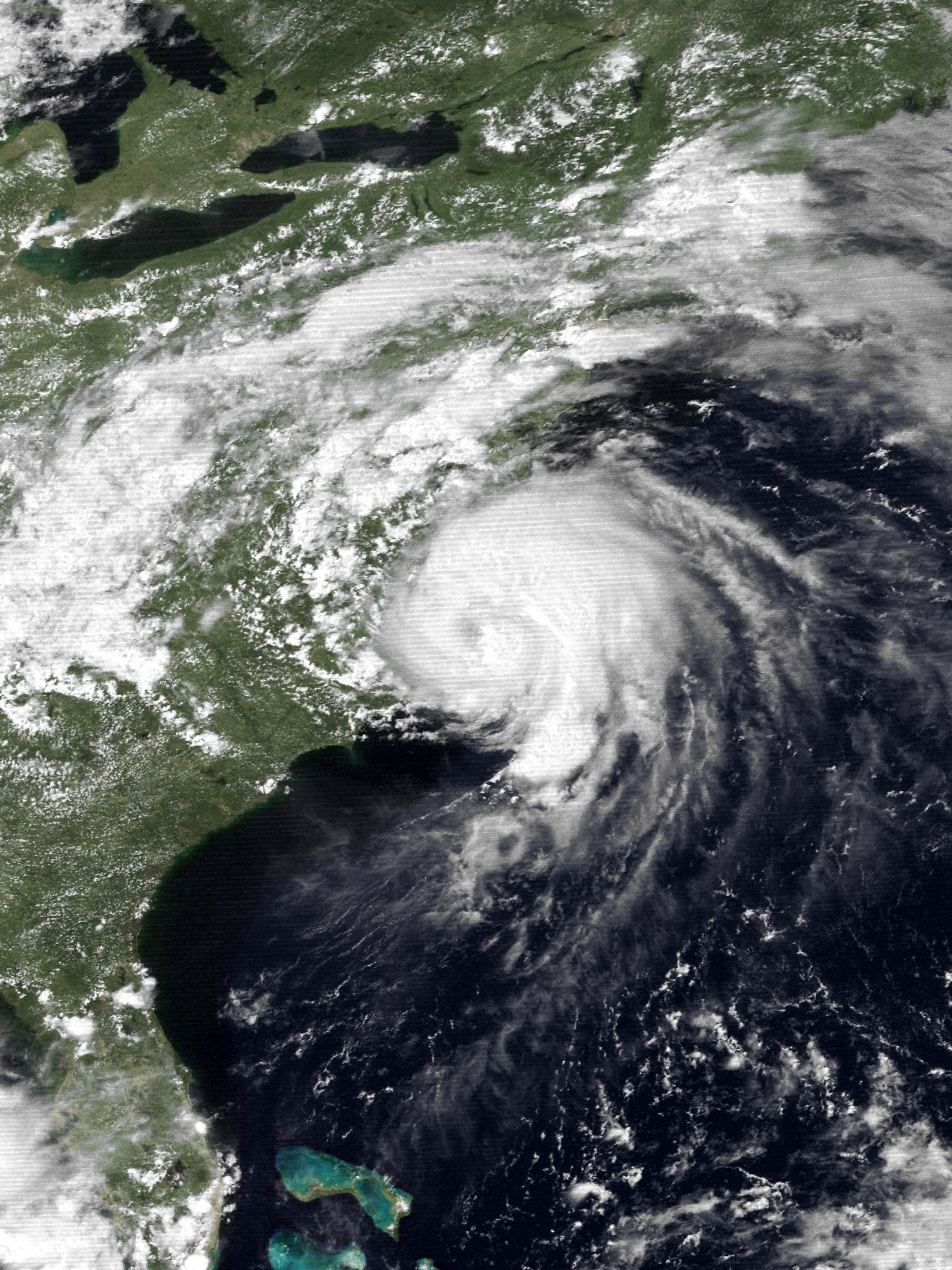
- Charley near peak intensity over the coast of North Carolina on August 17

Meteorological history
- Formed: August 15, 1986
- Extratropical: August 20, 1986
- Dissipated: August 30, 1986

Category 1 hurricane
- 1-minute sustained (SSHWS/NWS)
- Highest winds: 80 mph (130 km/h)
- Lowest pressure: 987 mbar (hPa); 29.15 inHg

Overall effects
- Fatalities: 15
- Damage: >$15 million (1986 USD) (Total for United States only)
- Areas affected: Southeastern United States, Mid-Atlantic states, Massachusetts, United Kingdom, Ireland
- IBTrACS
- Part of the 1986 Atlantic hurricane season

Hurricane Charley was the second hurricane to threaten the East Coast of the United States within a year's timeframe, after Hurricane Gloria of 1985. The third tropical storm and second hurricane of the season, Charley formed as a subtropical low on August 13 along the Florida panhandle. After moving off the coast of South Carolina, the system transitioned into a tropical cyclone and intensified into a tropical storm on August 15. Charley later attained hurricane status before moving across eastern North Carolina. It gradually weakened over the north Atlantic Ocean before transitioning into an extratropical cyclone on August 20. Charley's remnants remained identifiable for over a week, until after crossing Ireland and Great Britain they dissipated on August 30.

The storm brought light to moderate precipitation to much of the southeastern United States. In Georgia and South Carolina, the rainfall alleviated drought conditions. In North Carolina, where the hurricane made landfall, tidal flooding and downed trees were the primary impacts. The storm brought high winds to southeastern Virginia, where 110,000 people were left without power. Minor damage extended along the Atlantic coastline northward through Massachusetts. One traffic fatality was reported each in North Carolina and Virginia. Three people in Maryland died due to a plane crash related to the storm. Throughout the United States, Hurricane Charley caused an estimated US$15 million in damage (equivalent to US$44,100,000 in 2025). One person drowned in Newfoundland.

As an extratropical cyclone, Charley brought heavy rainfall and strong winds to Ireland and the United Kingdom, causing at least 11 deaths. In Ireland, the rainfall set records for 24-hour totals, including an accumulation of more than 7.8 in (200 mm) which set the record for the greatest daily rainfall total in the country. In the country, the rainfall caused widespread flooding, causing two rivers to exceed their banks. In the Dublin area, 451 buildings were flooded, some up to a depth of 8 ft (2.4 m). In the United Kingdom, the storm flooded rivers and brought down trees and power lines.

== Meteorological history ==
Map plotting the storm's track and intensity, according to the Saffir–Simpson scale Map key Saffir–Simpson scale Tropical depression (≤38 mph, ≤62 km/h) Tropical storm (39–73 mph, 63–118 km/h) Category 1 (74–95 mph, 119–153 km/h) Category 2 (96–110 mph, 154–177 km/h) Category 3 (111–129 mph, 178–208 km/h) Category 4 (130–156 mph, 209–251 km/h) Category 5 (≥157 mph, ≥252 km/h) Unknown Storm type Tropical cyclone Subtropical cyclone Extratropical cyclone, remnant low, tropical disturbance, or monsoon depression

Hurricane Charley originated in an area of convection associated with a trough of low pressure first observed on August 11 across southern Florida and the southeastern Gulf of Mexico. The area of disturbed weather spread northward, spawning a broad low-pressure area on August 12. Moving northward over the Florida panhandle, the low became slightly better organized as it merged with a weakening weather front. On August 13, the National Hurricane Center (NHC) identified the system as a developing subtropical low near Apalachee Bay along the northern coast of the Gulf of Mexico. The agency defines a subtropical cyclone as "a non-frontal low pressure system that has characteristics of both tropical and extratropical cyclones."

After becoming a subtropical low, the cyclone tracked northeastward through Georgia, before turning eastward and exiting South Carolina into the Atlantic Ocean. Its track was influenced by the western periphery of the subtropical ridge, which is a large belt of high pressure. While moving over land, the cyclone had become better organized, and on August 15 it transitioned into a tropical depression about 70 miles (110 kilometres) southeast of Charleston, South Carolina. The depression strengthened further, and based on reports from the Hurricane Hunters, it intensified into Tropical Storm Charley late on August 15. With a weak ridge to its north, the storm initially tracked slowly eastward just off the coast of North Carolina, before turning to the north-northeast as a trough approached from the west. A broad cyclone, Charley gradually intensified, and a single ring of convection around the center developed into an eyewall. At 1200 UTC on August 17, it attained hurricane status about 13 mi (21 km) off the North Carolina coastline. About two hours later, Hurricane Charley made landfall near Cape Lookout, and it subsequently moved across the eastern portion of the state.

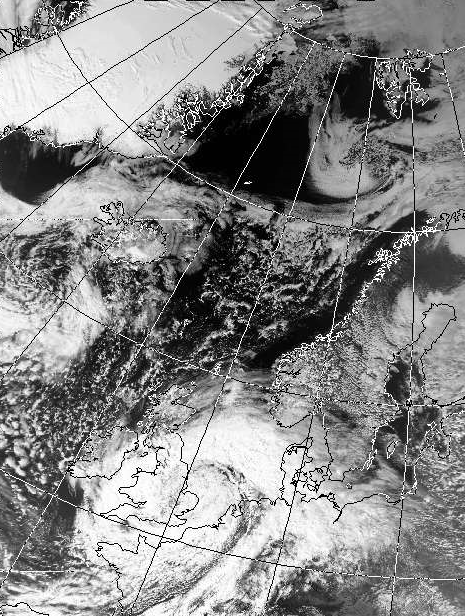
Charley moving over Ireland and the United Kingdom as an extratropical storm

Hurricane Charley did not weaken while moving over land; instead, it intensified, attaining peak winds of 80 mph (130 km/h) after emerging into the Atlantic Ocean near the North Carolina–Virginia border. Within 12 hours of reaching peak intensity, however, the hurricane weakened to tropical storm status. The approaching trough, which had previously caused Charley to turn northward, forced the hurricane to accelerate northeastward and later eastward, bringing the storm about 80 mi (130 km) southeast of Nantucket, Massachusetts on August 19. As the trough was not very strong, Charley slowly underwent the process of extratropical transition, unlike other tropical cyclones that complete the transition much quicker with a stronger trough. As a result, the storm maintained hybrid, or subtropical characteristics for several days. By August 21, Charley completed the transition south of Atlantic Canada.

After becoming extratropical, Charley re-intensified under baroclinic instability. The resulting storm was a very large and fairly strong gale that gradually moved across the northern Atlantic Ocean. As an extratropical cyclone, Charley attained an atmospheric pressure of 980 mbar, which was lower than its pressure as a tropical cyclone. On August 24, it spawned a separate extratropical cyclone, which initially moved northeastward before turning and dissipating near Spain. The remnants of Charley accelerated as it approached the British Isles and island of Ireland, and after passing south of Ireland it moved across Great Britain on August 27. While in the North Sea, the cyclone weakened as it executed a counter-clockwise loop, and on August 30 the remnants of Charley dissipated near Denmark as a new circulation developed to its southwest.

== North American impact ==
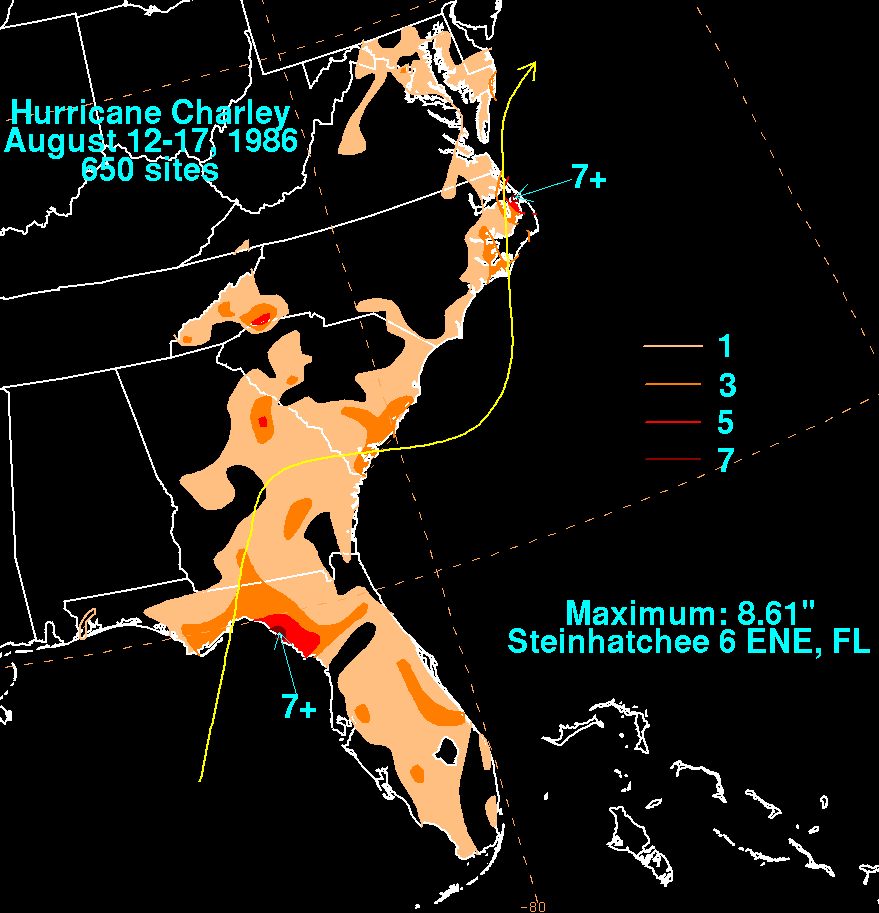
Rainfall Summary for Hurricane Charley in the United States

=== Southeastern United States ===
As the hurricane paralleled the east coast of the United States and its exact track and strength were uncertain, there were several tropical cyclone warnings and watches issued in association with Charley; in a post-storm analysis, the NHC described "the complication of the warning process for this type of situation." Initially, the storm was not expected to affect land. In its first advisory on Charley, the NHC issued a 22% probability of Charley passing within 65 mi (105 km) of land; specifically, it was predicted to be closest to the South Carolina coastline. About 16 hours prior to the hurricane's landfall, the NHC issued a gale warning between Bogue Inlet and Oregon Inlet along the North Carolina coastline, including the Pamlico Sound. When the storm's intensification and track close to land became apparent, the gale warning was replaced by a hurricane warning, and additional gale warnings were issued westward to Topsail Beach and northward to Virginia Beach, Virginia. Up to 10,000 people evacuated the Outer Banks, which resulted in traffic jams on roadways heading out of the area. Ocracoke island was partially evacuated by six ferries, although many people were unable to leave and instead rode out the storm on the island.

Hurricane Charley affected at least ten U.S. states, resulting in five total deaths and $15 million in damage (1986 USD). The precursor disturbance to Charley brought rainfall to much of Florida, including a total of 8.61 inches (219 millimetres) in Steinhatchee; that rainfall maxima was the greatest total associated with Charley within the United States. The system also produced light to moderate rainfall across Georgia and South Carolina, which proved beneficial as the region was in a major drought. However, its heaviest rainfall remained over open waters.

Moving across eastern North Carolina as a minimal hurricane, Charley produced locally strong wind gusts, peaking at 80 mph (130 km/h) in Frisco. However, no stations recorded sustained winds of hurricane force. The cyclone dropped rainfall along the coastline, amounting to over 7 in (180 mm) near Manteo. As it moved ashore, the storm generated high tides reaching 5.78 feet (1.76 metres) at the Duck Coe fishing pier. Near Cape Hatteras, a woman drowned while attempting to drive through a flooded roadway. The hurricane's passage left roads and bridges flooded with up to 3 ft (0.91 m) of water, including a portion of North Carolina Highway 12 on Hatteras Island. Across the Outer Banks, the storm left about 8,000 people without power, but damage was minimal and limited to shingles and roofs. Impact in the state was primarily caused by tidal flooding and downed trees, and a preliminary damage estimate placed total monetary losses at $400,000 (1986 USD).

=== Northeastern United States and Canada ===
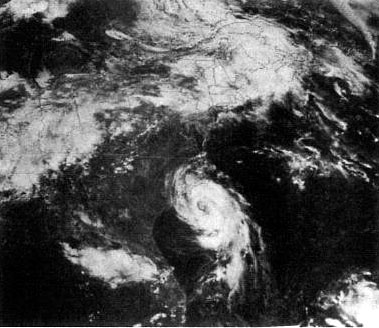
Satellite image of Charley prior to attaining hurricane status

As Charley moved across eastern North Carolina, hurricane warnings were extended northward, first to Virginia Beach; they were later extended to Cape Charles, then to the Maryland/Delaware border, and ultimately as far north as Sandy Hook, New Jersey. Prior to its arrival, the storm resulted in the closure of Norfolk International Airport, and more than 9,000 people evacuated the coastline for emergency shelters. Tropical storm force winds spread across southeastern Virginia, with wind gusts reaching 82 mph (132 km/h) on Cape Charles. Offshore, a station on the Chesapeake Bay Bridge–Tunnel recorded sustained winds of 97 mph (156 km/h) with gusts to 104 mph (167 km/h). After the gust, the bridge-tunnel was closed overnight. The winds downed many trees, and in Norfolk, a motorist died after crashing into a downed tree. In Virginia Beach, the winds blew off the roof of a hotel and destroyed two homes under construction. Across the area, the storm left about 110,000 customers without power. Rainfall in Virginia was fairly light, including a 24-hour total of just over 1 in (25 mm) in Norfolk. Strong waves destroyed 250 ft (76 m) of Harrison's Pier in Norfolk. A preliminary damage estimate for the area was $1 million (1986 USD).

Thunderstorms to the north of the circulation brought moderate rainfall to Maryland; the same thunderstorms caused a light aircraft to crash near Baltimore, resulting in the death of its three occupants. Rainfall spread across much of Maryland, peaking at 4.24 in (108 mm) in Hollywood. Tropical storm force winds extended into Delaware, and a peak wind gust of 75 mph (121 km/h) was reported in Rehoboth Beach. Only isolated and minor damage occurred in Maryland and Delaware. In New Jersey, a hurricane force wind gust was reported on Long Beach Island, and 1.3 in (33 mm) of rainfall was reported in Atlantic City. In the southernmost counties in the state, the winds left about 15,000 electrical customers without power. In New York, after Hurricane Gloria in the previous season left thousands of customers without power, the Long Island Lighting Co. arranged for additional workers for potential power restoration. Light rainfall and gusty winds extended into the New York metropolitan area.

Officials issued gale warnings through Chatham, Massachusetts, including Martha's Vineyard and Nantucket. As Charley passed south of Massachusetts, it produced precipitation in the southeastern portion of the state. Nantucket reported 3.20 in (81 mm) of rainfall, and Chatham recorded 2.68 in (68 mm) in a 24-hour period. Nantucket also reported sustained winds of 60 mph (97 km/h), and as the storm passed the island it produced a storm tide of 3.5–4 ft (1.1–1.2 m). High tides and heavy rain caused significant street flooding on Nantucket. Several boats were damaged, others were beached, and one large boat sunk in Nantucket Harbor. Damage on the island $75,000 (1986 USD).

Before becoming extratropical, the storm brushed the coast of Nova Scotia with wind gusts of 65 mph (105 km/h) and moderate precipitation totaling 4.57 in (116 mm). Strong waves damaged several boats along the coasts of Nova Scotia and New Brunswick, killing one person in St. John's, Newfoundland.

== European impact ==
Wettest tropical cyclones and their remnants in the United Kingdom Highest-known totals
Precipitation			Storm	Location	Ref.
Rank	mm	in	Storm	Location	Ref.
1	150.0	5.91	Bertha 2014	Inverness, Highland	
2	135.0	5.31	Charley 1986	Abergwyngregyn, Gwynedd	
3	130.0	5.12	Nadine 2012	Ravensworth, North Yorkshire	
4	76.0	2.99	Lili 1996	Chale Bay, Isle of Wight	
5	61.7	2.43	Zeta 2020	Chipping, Lancashire	
6	48.8	1.92	Grace 2009	Capel Curig, Conwy	
7	42.2	1.66	Gordon 2006	Wainfleet All Saints, Lincolnshire	
8	38.0	1.50	Gonzalo 2014	Glenmoriston, Highland	
9	31.0	1.22	Bill 2009	Shap, Cumbria	
10	30.0	1.18	Laura 2008	Windermere, Cumbria	

After Charley became extratropical, the United Kingdom Met Office issued weather alerts prior to the arrival of the storm, noting the potential for "extremely heavy rainfall [which would] cause local flooding." In the United Kingdom, the threat of the storm resulted in the cancellation of ferry service between Northern Ireland and Great Britain, as well between Great Britain and France. The extratropical remnants of Hurricane Charley moved across Ireland and United Kingdom with winds of 50 mph (80 km/h). The storm's rainfall significantly affected most of both countries, with the exception of Scotland in the United Kingdom. In the English Channel, waves up to 26 ft (7.9 m) in height breached and flooded a ship; the 31 passengers on board were rescued by helicopters and other ships. Throughout the region, the storm resulted in at least 11 deaths.

=== Ireland ===
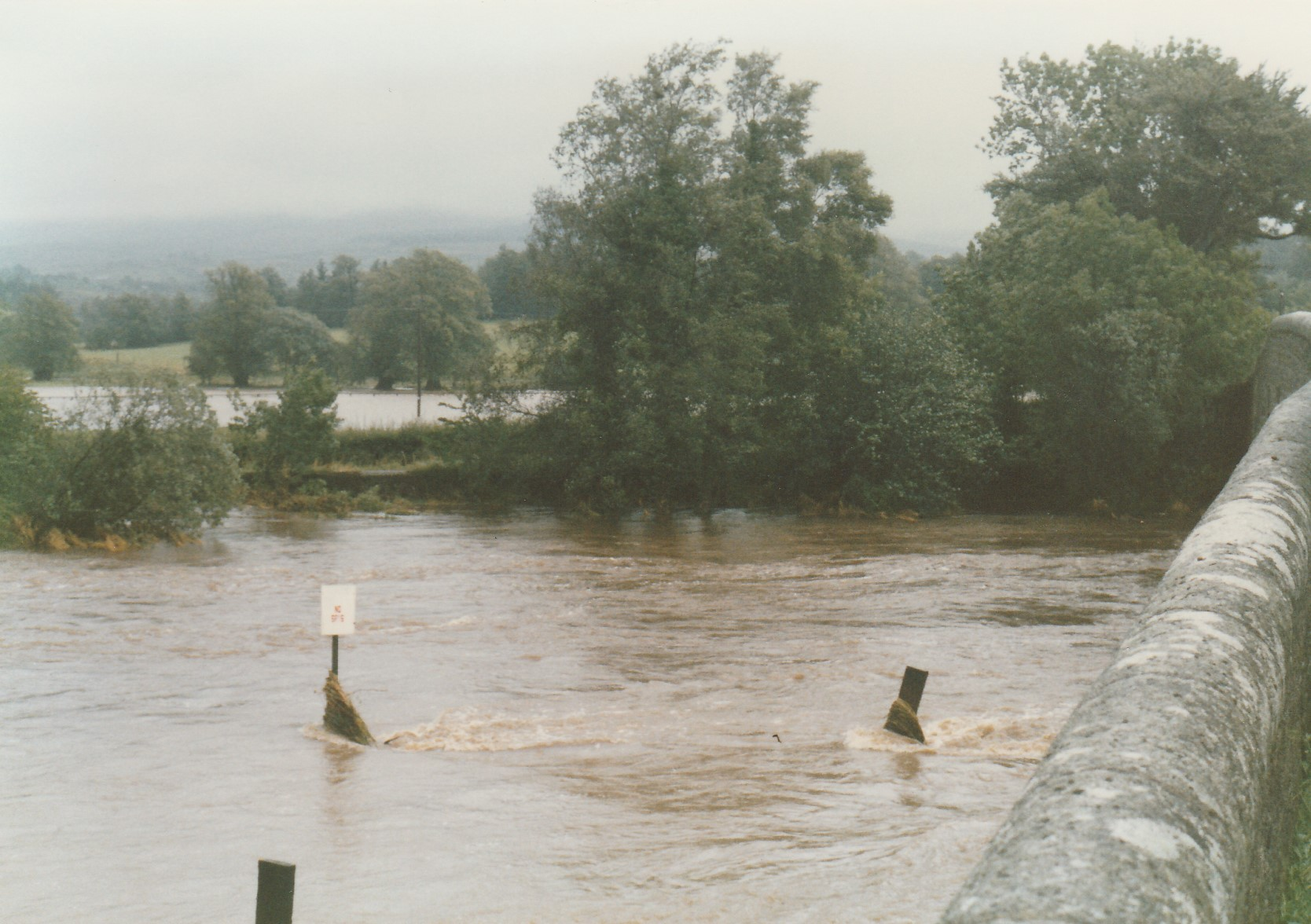
The River Liffey in flood at Ballyward Bridge, Manor Kilbride after heavy rainfall

First passing just south of Ireland on August 25, the storm dropped heavy rainfall and brought strong winds, significantly affecting the coastline where winds of 65 mph (105 km/h) were reported. Rainfall spread across the entire country, peaking at 11.0 in (280 mm) in Kippure mountain. There, a station reported more than 7.8 in (200 mm) in 24 hours, which set the record for the greatest daily rainfall total in the country. Several 24-hour rainfall records were set during the storm, and new six-hour and twelve-hour record totals at Casement Aerodrome were set with 1.63 and 2.61 in (41 and 66 mm), respectively. The rainfall left some areas flooded, particularly in the Dublin area where 451 buildings were inundated, some up to a depth of 8 ft (2.4 m). Preliminarily, it was described as the worst flooding in the history of Dublin. Two small rivers, the Dodder and the Dargle, overflowed their banks due to the rainfall. The River Dargle overflowed in Bray, flooding some areas up to a depth of 5 ft (1.5 m) and forcing about 1,000 people to evacuate; several special-needs people were evacuated by boat. The flood, which originated about one mile north of the town, damaged over 500 houses and brought down several trees. Despite local politicians promising for flood protection after the flood, the town remained vulnerable to such flooding at least 20 years after the storm.

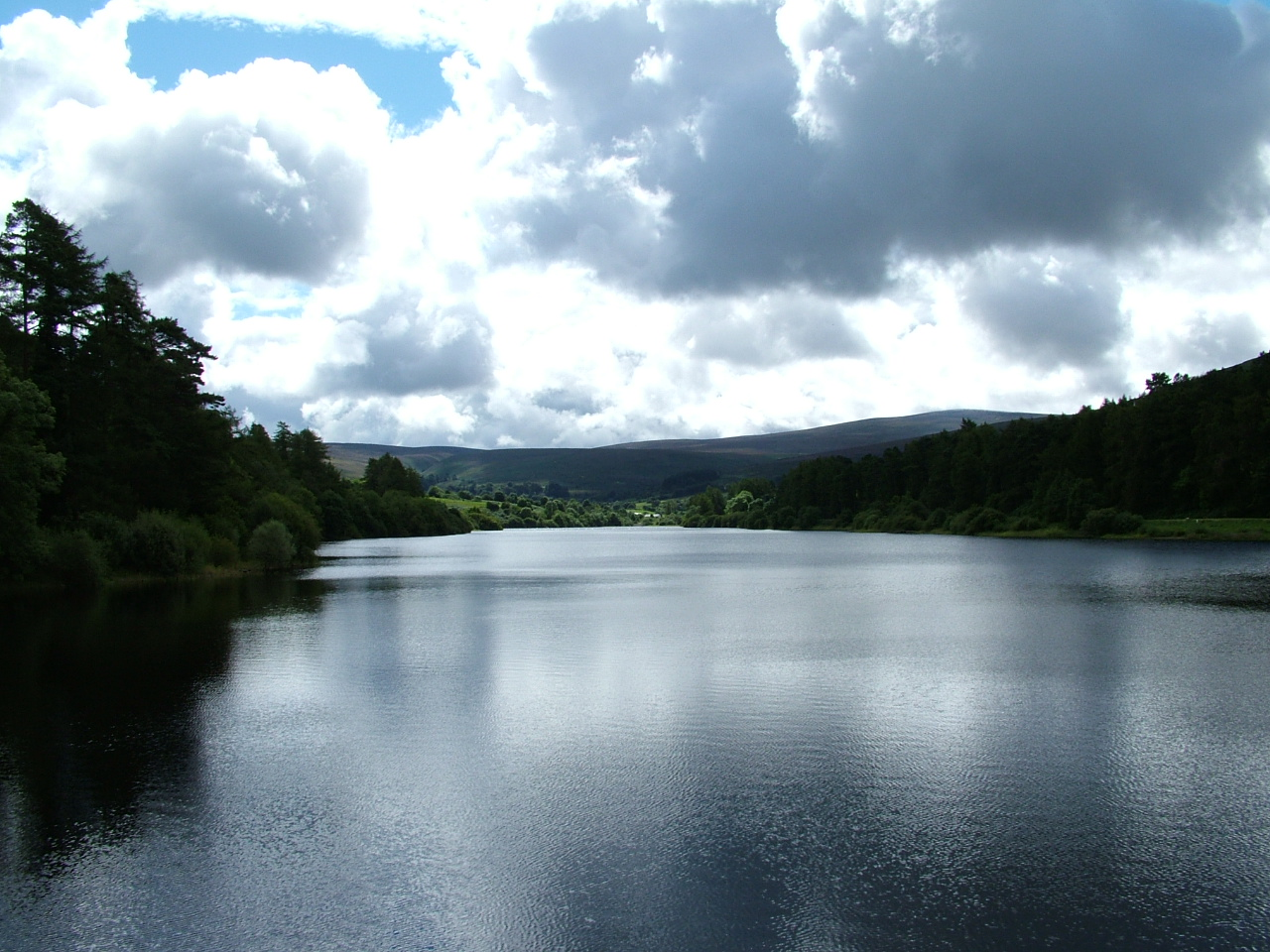
Reservoir dam in Ireland that nearly overflowed due to Charley

The River Dodder, which also overflowed, nearly exceeded the reservoir dam in Bohernabreena in South Dublin (flooding on the Dodder has been a periodic problem for centuries). Additional spillways were later added in the event of another similar flood. In the Wicklow Mountains, the rainfall resulted in significant runoff, which caused erosion along the Cloghoge River. The passage of the storm left heavy crop damage, part of a larger period of poor agriculture in the country. Throughout the country, the storm caused at least thirteen deaths, four of which were drownings in flooded rivers; one death was caused by a heart attack while being evacuated from flooding. Two months after the storm struck, the government of Ireland allocated IR£6,449,000 (1986 IEP, $8,650,000 1986 USD) to repair roads and bridges damaged by the weather system.

=== United Kingdom ===
The storm also affected the United Kingdom as it moved across the southern portion of the country. In Wales, Charley produced record-breaking daily rainfall, which surpassed 4 inches (100 mm) in Dyfed. Some locations received hundred-year rainfall. The storm struck the area during the Late Summer Bank Holiday, creating unfavorable conditions for driving and resulting in several accidents. Heavy rainfall flooded rivers, which swept away several people. This prompted officials to deploy boats and helicopters to assist in rescues, although at least three deaths were reported due to drowning in the rivers. Severe flooding was reported in Cumbria and Gloucestershire. The storm also left roads blocked by fallen trees and power lines. At the start of the storm, the inaugural Birmingham Super Prix motorsport race was just getting underway but poor visibility from precipitation contributed to an accident which temporarily called halt to proceedings. In Whitland, Wales, local soldiers assisted rescuing people, and later contributed to the cleanup of the town. Throughout the country, five people were missing after the storm, all of whom are presumed to have drowned; an additional death was confirmed in Newry, Northern Ireland.

== See also ==
- List of North Carolina hurricanes (1980–1999)
- Other tropical cyclones named Charley
- Tropical cyclone effects in Europe
- Great Storm of 1987
