= 1986–1988 El Niño event =

Beginning in mid-to-late 1986, a moderate or strong El Niño began taking place in the Central and Western Pacific, although in the first several months of 1987, some of this activity also affected the Eastern Pacific. These El Niños, although not as strong as the major 1982–83 El Niño event and did not conclude early like that event, affected the weather across the world during most of 1986, the entirety of 1987 and the first two-to-four months of 1988.

These El Niños from 1986 to 1988 were mostly Modoki (or Central / Western Pacific Ocean) events due to which the 1986 and 1987 Atlantic hurricane seasons had only six or seven named tropical storms or hurricanes each while the 1986 and 1987 Pacific hurricane seasons were very active as was typical during the majority of the 1980s and first five years during the 1990s. These events ended in early 1988 and then gave way into a La Niña event which lasted into 1989.
