= 1986–87 South-West Indian Ocean cyclone season =

Cyclone season in the Southwest Indian Ocean

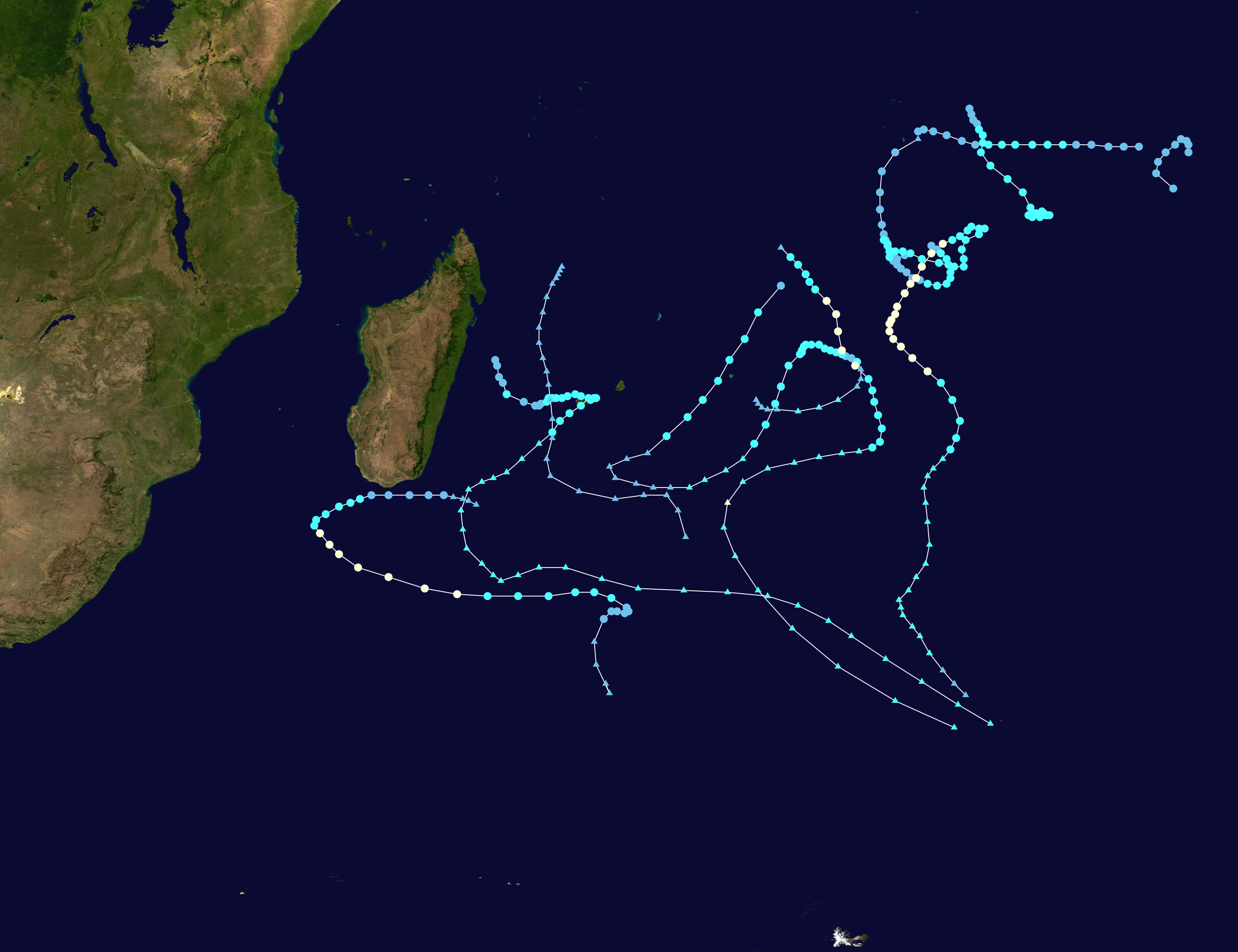
- Season summary map

Seasonal boundaries
- First system formed: 16 January 1987
- Last system dissipated: 29 April 1987

Strongest storm
- Name: Daodo
  - Maximum winds: 135 km/h (85 mph) (10-minute sustained)
  - Lowest pressure: 954 hPa (mbar)

Seasonal statistics
- Total disturbances: 10
- Total depressions: 9
- Total storms: 8
- Tropical cyclones: 1
- Total fatalities: 12 total
- Total damage: $2 million (1987 USD)

Related articles
- 1986–87 Australian region cyclone season; 1986–87 South Pacific cyclone season

The 1986–87 South-West Indian Ocean cyclone season was below average due to an ongoing El Niño and a weak monsoon that suppressed convection and storms. There were only five named storms tracked by the Météo-France office (MFR) on Réunion. The United States–based Joint Typhoon Warning Center (JTWC) followed four other storms in the basin, which is the waters of the Indian Ocean south of the equator and west of 90° E to the coast of Africa. The JTWC tracked a storm on August 1 in the northeastern portion of the basin, unusual for the time of year. The first named storm was Severe Tropical Storm Alinina, which originated from the Intertropical Convergence Zone east of Madagascar in the middle of January. However, there was an unnamed tropical depression that produced heavy rainfall in Réunion and Madagascar, causing two deaths in the latter country.

In February, two tropical storms were active near the Mascarene Islands. Tropical Storm Bemezava was a weak storm that took an erratic track around the island of Rodrigues. Tropical Storm Clotilda, the most damaging of the season, stalled near Réunion for three days, producing 2,723 mm (107.2 in) of rainfall at Bébourg. The rainfall totals approached the world record precipitation totals set by Cyclone Hyacinthe in 1980. The rains killed 10 people, destroyed 120 houses, and caused $2 million (1987 USD) in damage. Later, Daodo in March was the strongest storm of the season and the only to attain tropical cyclone status, reaching of 135 km/h (85 mph). Elizabeta was the final storm of the season tracked by the MFR, forming south of Madagascar in April and dissipating on April 29.

== Seasonal summary ==
During the season, the Météo-France office (MFR) on Réunion island issued warnings in tropical cyclones within the basin. Using satellite imagery from National Oceanic and Atmospheric Administration, the agency estimated intensity through the Dvorak technique, and warned on tropical cyclones in the region from the coast of Africa to 90° E, south of the equator. The World Meteorological Organization would later label the MFR as a Regional Specialized Meteorological Center in 1993. The Joint Typhoon Warning Center (JTWC), which is a joint United States Navy – United States Air Force task force, also issued tropical cyclone warnings for the southwestern Indian Ocean. The season's five named storms and one tropical cyclone – a storm attaining maximum sustained winds of at least 120 km/h (75 mph) – were both below the average of nine and five, respectively. The MFR considered the tropical cyclone year to begin on August 1 and continue to July 31 of the following year. There was an ongoing El Niño by December, and by January, the monsoon was weaker than normal across the region. This caused below normal thunderstorm activity in February.

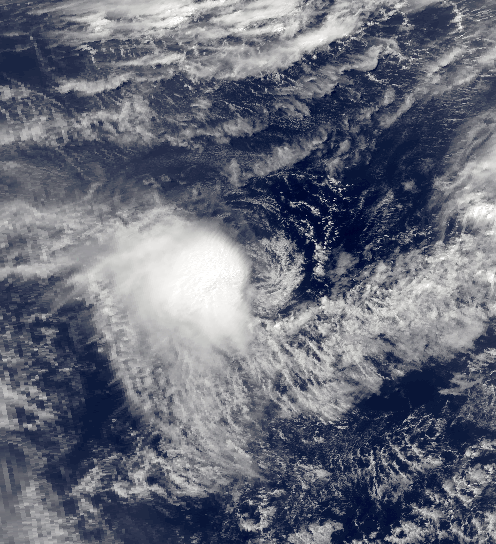
Satellite image of the unofficial August tropical storm

In addition to the storms classified by the MFR, the JTWC tracked four additional storms. The first, classified as Tropical Cyclone 01S, formed on August 1 in the northeastern portion of the basin, an infrequent event for the time of year. The storm moved westward with peak 1 minute winds of 85 km/h (55 mph). It gradually weakened, dissipating on August 3 near Diego Garcia. The JTWC also tracked a short-lived storm in January that they classified as Tropical Cyclone 06S. The storm formed on January 7 in the eastern portion of the basin near Diego Garcia, and reached winds of 85 km/h (55 mph) while moving southeastward. After stalling on January 9, the system dissipated three days later. Later, the agency monitored Tropical Cyclone 26S beginning on April 24. The storm formed south of Diego Garcia and moved in a counterclockwise direction, first to the southeast and later to the north. After reaching peak 1 minute winds of 85 km/h (55 mph), the storm dissipated on April 26. The final storm tracked by the agency originated on June 25 in the far northeastern portion of the basin between Diego Garcia and the Cocos Islands. It moved slowly to the southwest, failing to intensify beyond winds of 65 km/h (40 mph). Turning to the southeast, the system dissipated on June 27.

The MFR did not track any tropical depressions before January, making Alinina in January the first official storm of the season. However, there was an earlier tropical depression that originated as a low-pressure area on January 1 near Tromelin Island. It was a large system that spread rainfall between Madagascar and the Mascarene Islands for several days. By January 2, the depression consisted of a circulation with spiral rainbands about 150 km (95 mi) west of Tromelin. The system moved southward without intensifying much, and it passed about 130 km (80 mi) west of Réunion on January 4. While near the island, the depression dropped heavy rainfall that broke 24‑hour totals at 10 locations, peaking at 600 mm (24 in) at Dos d'Âne. The system intensified slightly afterward, although it turned to the east due to a ridge to the south and was no longer tracked after January 6. In Madagascar, the heavy rainfall led to flooding around the capital Antananarivo, displacing 40,220 people. The floodwaters covered rice fields and entered houses, killing two people. Local Red Cross offices provided shelter and food to victims.

== Systems ==
=== Severe Tropical Storm Alinina ===
- Severe tropical storm (MFR)
- Category 1 tropical cyclone (SSHWS)
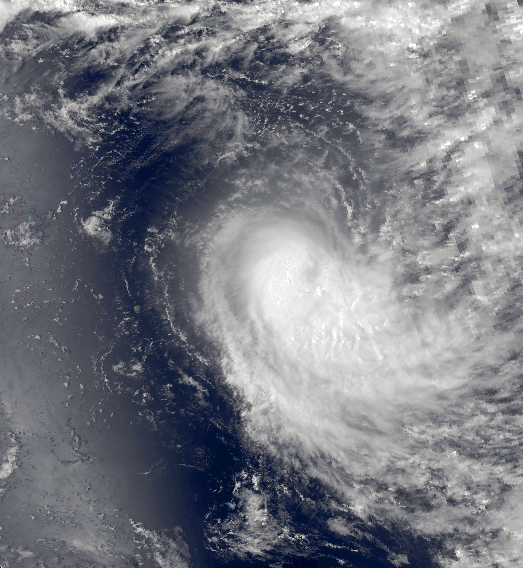
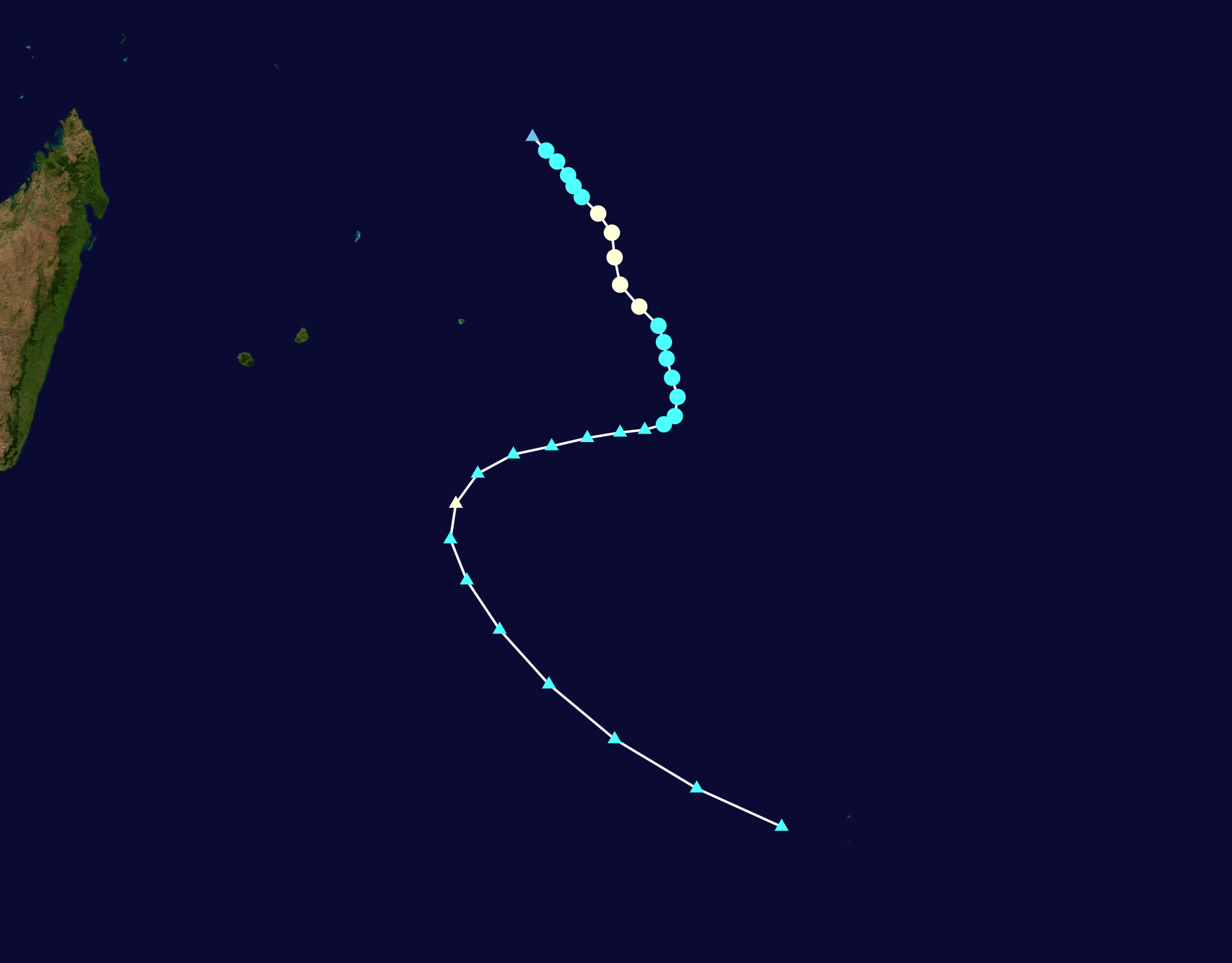
- Duration: January 16 – January 24
- Peak intensity: 95 km/h (60 mph) (10-min); 976 hPa (mbar)

Toward the middle of January, the Intertropical Convergence Zone (ITCZ) spawned an area of convection between Diego Garcia and St. Brandon. A tropical disturbance formed the next day, characterized by spiral rainbands around a circulation. The JTWC classified the system as Tropical Cyclone 09S on January 16. The system moved to the southeast, intensifying into tropical storm status on January 17, whereupon it was named Alinina by the Mauritius Meteorology Service. Later that day, the JTWC upgraded the storm to the equivalent of a minimal hurricane due to the storm's quick organization while passing east of Rodrigues. On January 18, the MFR estimated peak 10 minute winds of 95 km/h (60 mph), while the JTWC assessed peak 1 minute winds of 140 km/h (85 mph). Subsequently, the storm weakened, and Alinina turned sharply westward on January 20 due to a building ridge to the south. On that day, the storm weakened to tropical depression status, and the JTWC discontinued advisories. However, Alinina quickly retained tropical storm status. Once the ridge turned to the east, the storm turned to the southeast, the same day that the JTWC reissued advisories. Shortly thereafter, the agency upgraded Alinina to the equivalent of a hurricane for a second time. This was short-lived, as Alinina rapidly weakened while accelerating to the southeast, dissipating on January 23 as it was absorbed by the westerlies.

=== Moderate Tropical Storm Bemazava ===
- Moderate tropical storm (MFR)
- Tropical storm (SSHWS)
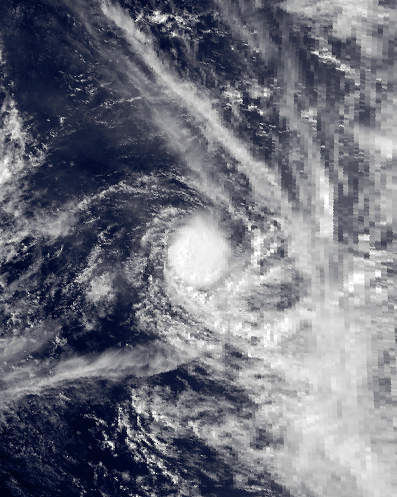
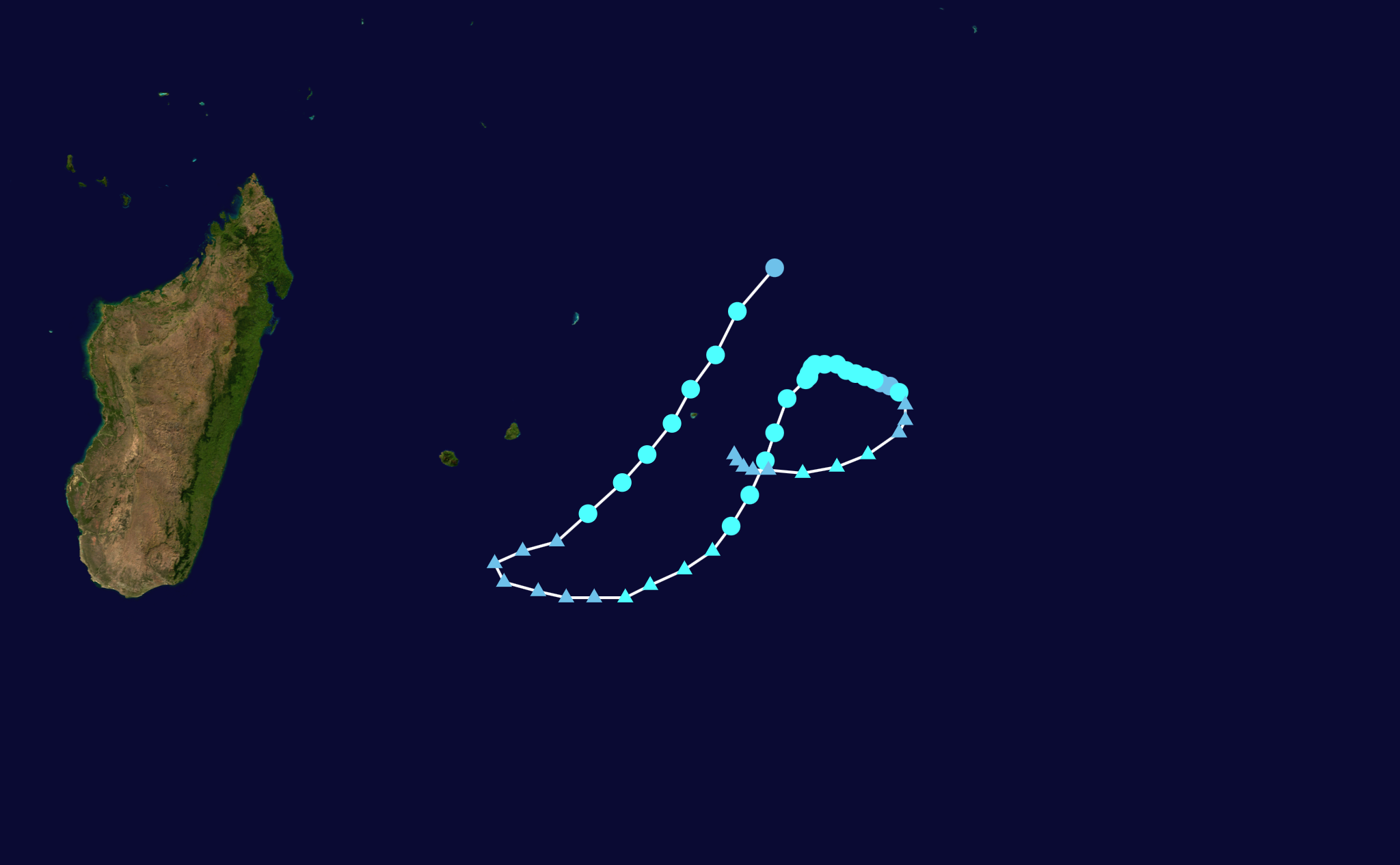
- Duration: February 5 – February 17
- Peak intensity: 65 km/h (40 mph) (10-min); 997 hPa (mbar)

The ITCZ produced an area of convection north of the Mascarene Islands on February 5, organizing into a tropical disturbance that day about 590 km (365 mi) northeast of Rodrigues. The system initially consisted spiral rainbands around an organizing center. Moving quickly to the southwest, the disturbance passed west of Rodrigues on February 6, producing wind gusts of 117 km/h (73 mph) likely due to a localized vortex. Despite only being a disturbance, the Mauritius Meteorology Service named the system Bemezava on February 6. On the next day, the depression turned sharply to the east due to a nearby ridge, passing 350 km (215 mi) southeast of Mauritius. Bemezava intensified into a moderate tropical storm on February 8, attaining peak 10 minute winds of 65 km/h (40 mph). It turned back to the northeast and weakened, tracked only by satellite imagery as a weak circulation. Bemezava looped to the west beginning on February 10, turning to the southeast and back to the west. It dissipated on February 17 about 200 km (125 mi) southeast of Rodrigues, or about 680 km (425 mi) south of where it first formed.

=== Severe Tropical Storm Clotilda ===
- Severe tropical storm (MFR)
- Tropical storm (SSHWS)
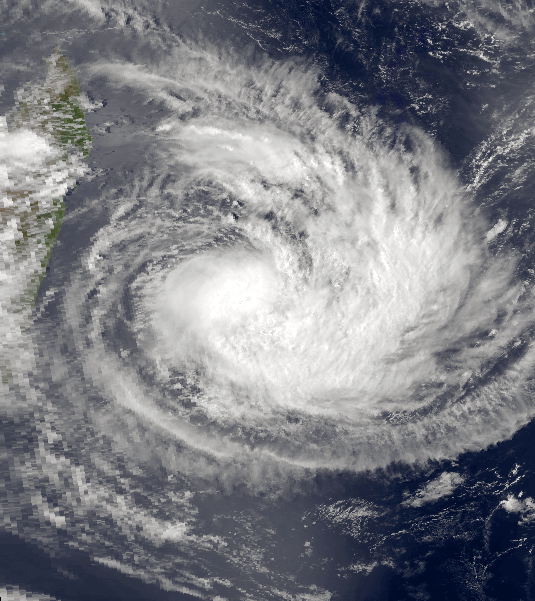
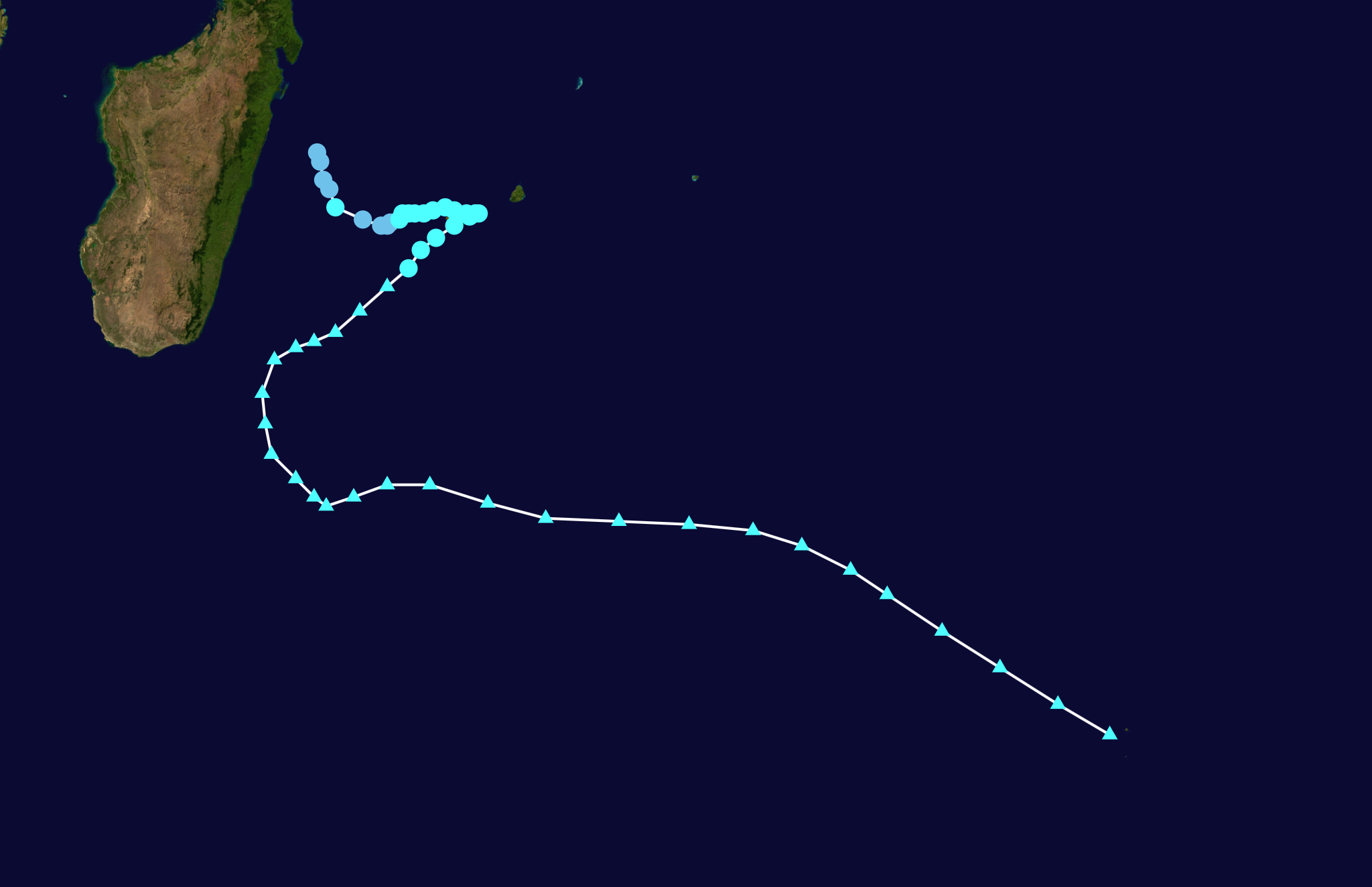
- Duration: February 9 – February 22
- Peak intensity: 110 km/h (70 mph) (10-min); 970 hPa (mbar)

While Bemezava was still active, another circulation was present between Réunion and Madagascar on February 8. On the next day, a tropical disturbance formed about 150 km (95 mi) east-southeast of Toamasina, Madagascar. A ridge to the south caused the nascent system to move erratic, although generally to the southeast and east. It intensified into Tropical Storm Clotilda on February 10, and on the next day that the JTWC classified it as Tropical Cyclone 17S. The storm slowed and approached within 50 km (30 mi) of Réunion before stalling. It moved slowly near the island for two days, during which it remained about 30 km (18 mi) off the northern coast. On February 13, Clotilda attained peak 10 minute winds of 110 km/h (70 mph). A weak ridge steered the storm back to the southwest, and on February 14, Clotilda struck northern Réunion at Sainte-Suzanne. The ridge moved to the east, causing the storm to accelerate and gradually weaken. On February 17, Clotilda became extratropical while turning southeastward due to an approaching trough. The remnants persisted several days until dissipating on February 22 near Île Amsterdam.

While stalling, Clotilda affected Mauritius with gusty winds and heavy rainfall, which flooded several homes. However, effects were worst on Réunion, where wind gusts reached 173 km/h (107 mph) and rainfall totaled 2,723 mm (107.2 in) at Bébourg. The deluge approached the record-setting rains from Cyclone Hyacinthe in 1980 over a 72‑hour period. Clotilda damaged 250 houses, of which 120 were destroyed. About 150,000 people on the island lost access to water, and many roads were damaged. Clotilda killed 10 people on the island, and damage totaled around $2 million (USD).

=== Tropical Cyclone Daodo ===
- Tropical cyclone (MFR)
- Category 1 tropical cyclone (SSHWS)
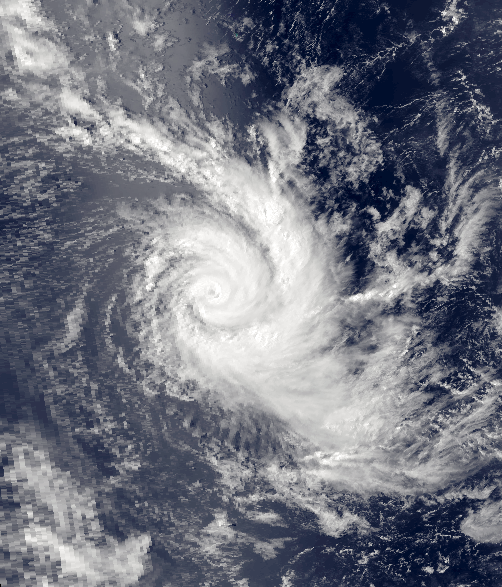
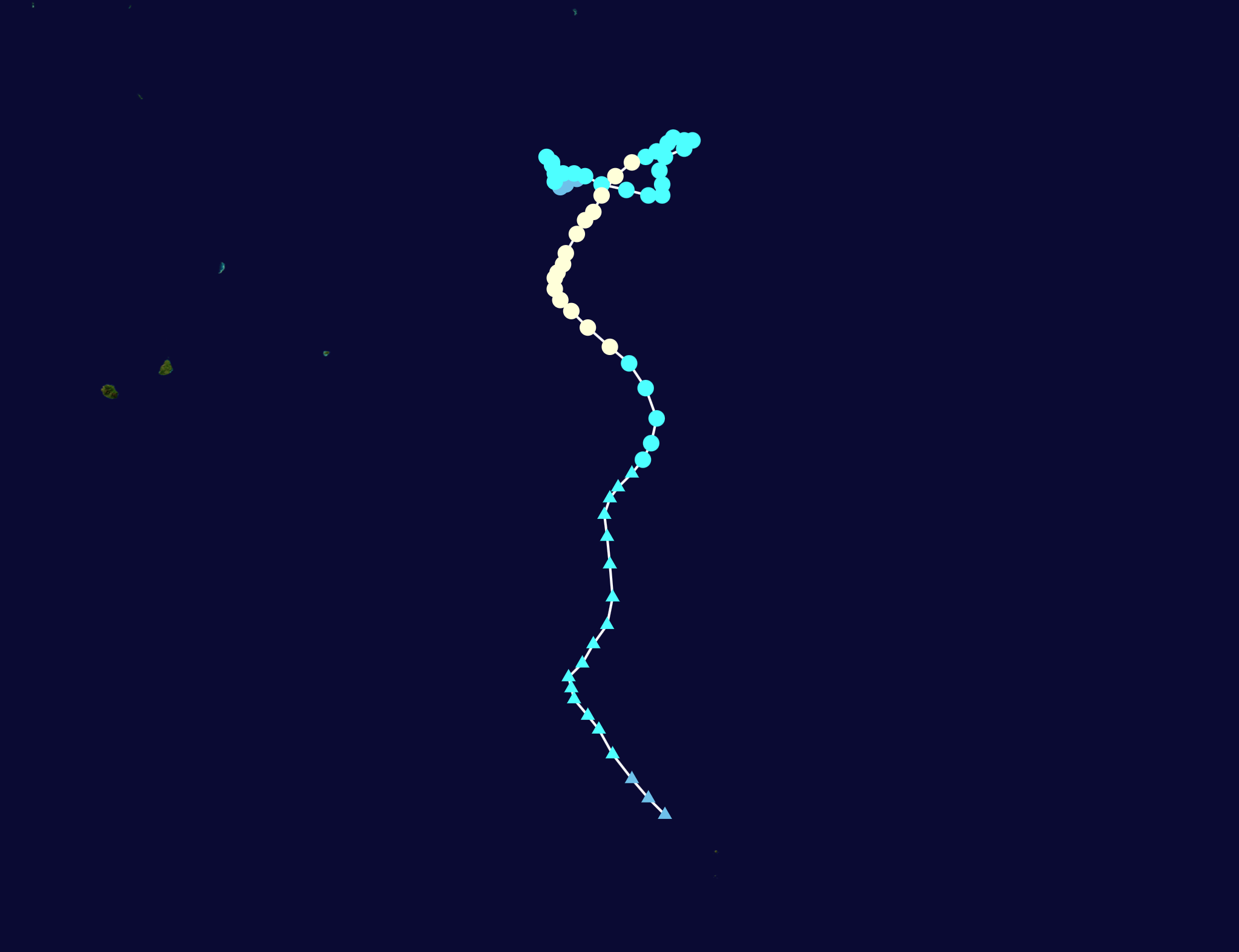
- Duration: March 2 – March 18
- Peak intensity: 135 km/h (85 mph) (10-min); 954 hPa (mbar)

Several areas of convection persisted within the ITCZ in early March across the open Indian Ocean. One of these organized into a tropical storm on March 2 about 700 km (430 mi) south of Diego Garcia and was given the name Daodo. On the following day, the JTWC began tracking it as Tropical Cyclone 21S. Daodo moved slowly initially while quickly strengthening into a severe tropical storm. On March 4, a weak ridge steered the storm to the east, and the storm weakened slightly during this time. Three days later a stronger ridge to the east turned Daodo to the southwest, bringing it over its former path. On March 8, the JTWC upgraded the storm to the equivalent of a minimal hurricane. On the following day, the MFR upgraded Daodo to tropical cyclone status, estimating peak 10 minute winds of 135 km/h (85 mph), although it weakened back into a tropical storm on March 10. The storm accelerated to the southeast on the next day and maintained much of its intensity due to baroclinic interactions with a nearby anticyclone. On March 13, Daodo turned back to the southwest before moving more southward and later to the southeast. On March 18, the storm dissipated within a polar trough northwest of Île Amsterdam.

=== Severe Tropical Storm Elizabeta ===
- Severe tropical storm (MFR)
- Category 1 tropical cyclone (SSHWS)
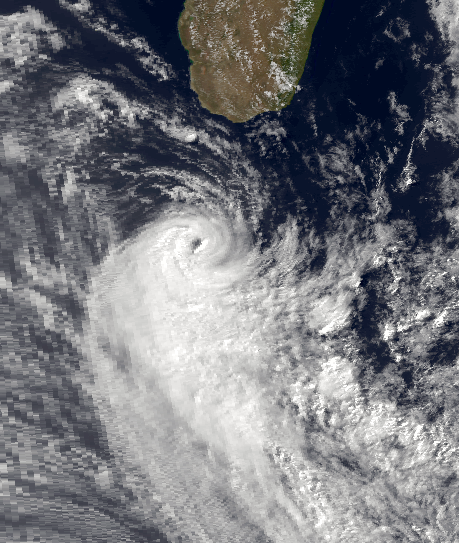
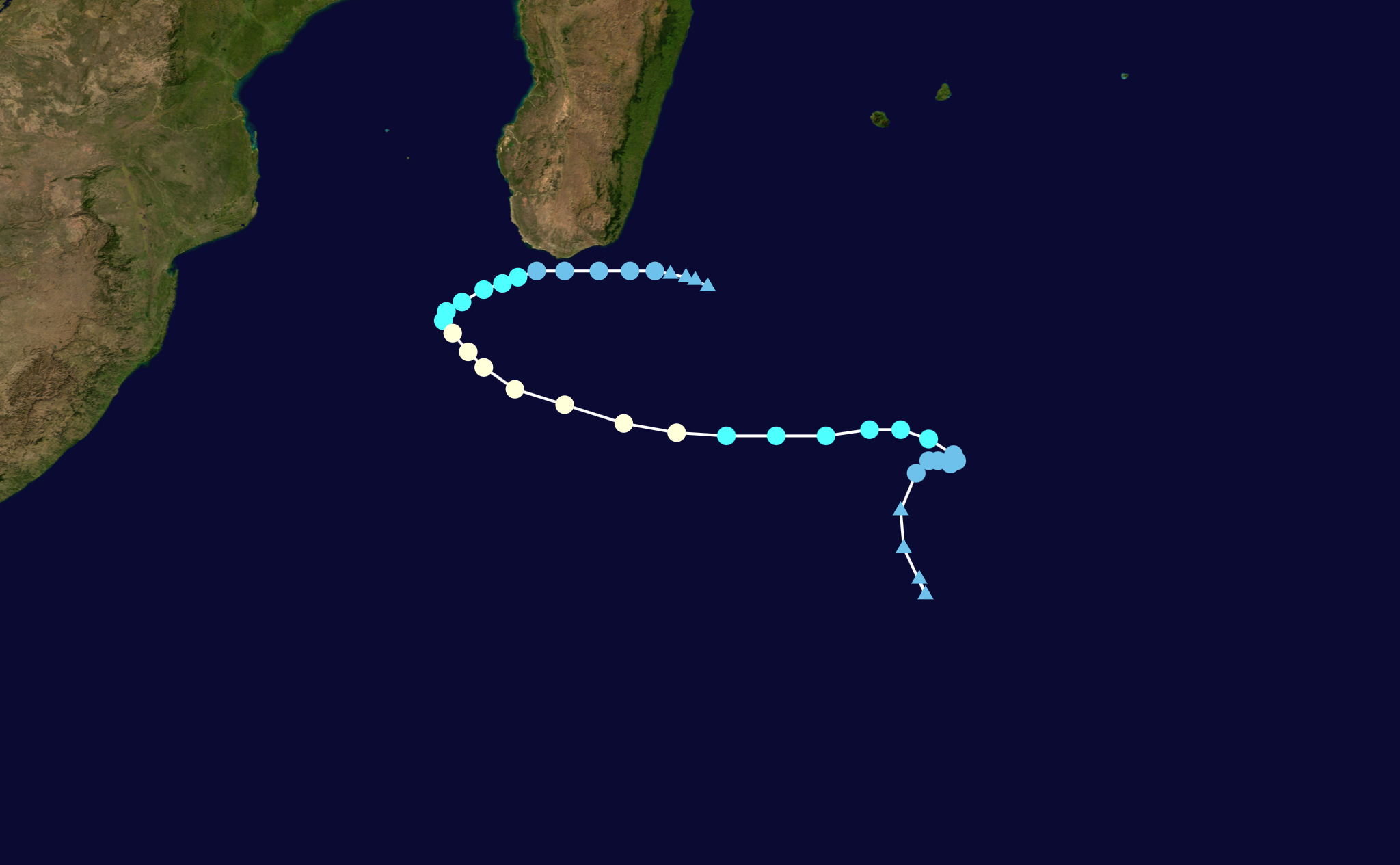
- Duration: April 20 – April 29
- Peak intensity: 95 km/h (60 mph) (10-min); 976 hPa (mbar)

In the middle of April, a plume of moist air from the equator reached a circulation southeast of Madagascar, which was associated with a trough. On April 20, a tropical disturbance formed about 350 km (215 mi) southeast of the southernmost point of Madagascar. A strong ridge to the south steered the system westward, bringing it south of the island on April 22. After several days without much strengthening, the system began intensifying steadily on April 23, becoming a moderate tropical storm. That day, the Madagascar Meteorological Service named it Elizabeta, and the JTWC classified it as Tropical Cyclone 24S. Around that time, the storm turned sharply to the south due to a passing trough. Late on April 23, the JTWC upgraded Elizabeta to the equivalent of a minimal hurricane. On the next day, the MFR estimated peak 10 minute winds of 95 km/h (60 mph), and the JTWC estimated 1 minute winds of 140 km/h (85 mph). A ridge turned the storm eastward, and Elizabeta gradually weakened, deteriorating to tropical depression status by April 25. Two days later, the system turned to a westward drift due to small ridge, although it turned back to the south the next day due to another ridge. The weak circulation accelerated to the southeast into a polar trough, dissipating on April 29.

Although Elizabeta passed just south of the Madagascar, effects were minimal there. However, the storm caused a large fall in barometric pressure at Fort Dauphin, with a drop of 8.3 mbar (0.25 inHg) over 24 hours.

== Season effects ==
| Name | Dates | Peak intensity | | | Areas affected | Damage (USD) | Deaths | Refs |
| Name | Dates | Category | Wind speed | Pressure | Areas affected | Damage (USD) | Deaths | Refs |
|---|---|---|---|---|---|---|---|---|
| 01S | August 1–3 | Moderate Tropical Storm | 80 km/h (50 mph) | 991 hPa (29.26 inHg) | None | None | None | |
| Unnamed | January 1–6 | Tropical Depression | 55 km/h (35 mph) | 1,000 hPa (29.53 inHg) | Réunion, Madagascar | Unknown | 2 | |
| 06S | January 7–12 | Moderate Tropical Storm | 80 km/h (50 mph) | 991 hPa (29.26 inHg) | None | None | None | |
| Alinina | January 16–24 | Severe Tropical Storm | 95 km/h (60 mph) | 976 hPa (28.82 inHg) | None | None | None | |
| Bemazava | February 5–17 | Moderate Tropical Storm | 65 km/h (40 mph) | 997 hPa (29.44 inHg) | None | None | None | |
| Clotilda | February 9–22 | Severe Tropical Storm | 110 km/h (70 mph) | 970 hPa (28.64 inHg) | Mascarene Islands | $10 million | 10 | |
| Daodo | March 2–18 | Tropical Cyclone | 135 km/h (85 mph) | 954 hPa (28.17 inHg) | None | None | None | |
| Elizabeta | April 20–29 | Severe Tropical Storm | 95 km/h (60 mph) | 976 hPa (28.82 inHg) | Madagascar | None | None | |
| 26S | April 24–26 | Moderate Tropical Storm | 80 km/h (50 mph) | 991 hPa (29.26 inHg) | None | None | None | |
| 28S | June 25–27 | Tropical Depression | 50 km/h (30 mph) | 1,000 hPa (29.53 inHg) | None | None | None | |
Season aggregates
| 10 systems | July 30 – June 27 | | 135 km/h (85 mph) | 954 hPa (28.17 inHg) | | $10 million | 12 | |

== See also ==
- Atlantic hurricane seasons: 1986, 1987
- Eastern Pacific hurricane seasons: 1986, 1987
- Western Pacific typhoon seasons: 1986, 1987
- North Indian Ocean cyclone seasons: 1986, 1987
