= 1986 Atlantic hurricane season =

- Season summary map

Seasonal boundaries
- First system formed: June 5, 1986
- Last system dissipated: November 21, 1986

Strongest storm
- Name: Earl
  - Maximum winds: 105 mph (165 km/h) (1-minute sustained)
  - Lowest pressure: 979 mbar (hPa; 28.91 inHg)

Seasonal statistics
- Total depressions: 10
- Total storms: 6
- Hurricanes: 4
- Major hurricanes (Cat. 3+): 0
- Total fatalities: 21 total
- Total damage: > $67.5 million (1986 USD)

Related articles
- 1986 Pacific hurricane season; 1986 Pacific typhoon season; 1986 North Indian Ocean cyclone season

The 1986 Atlantic hurricane season was a very inactive season that produced 10 depressions, 6 named storms, 4 hurricanes, and no major hurricanes. The season officially began on June 1, 1986, and lasted until November 30, 1986. These dates conventionally delimit the period of each year when most tropical cyclones form in the Atlantic basin. During the 1986 season, the first subtropical depression formed in the first week of June, while the last tropical cyclone dissipated at the end of the third week of November. The 1986 season had lower than average activity because of an ongoing El Niño, and was the least active season in the North Atlantic since the 1983 Atlantic hurricane season. This was also the first season since 1972 to have no major hurricanes.

The season started on June 5 when Subtropical Depression One formed near the Bahamas, which would later gain tropical characteristics and become the first tropical storm of the season; Tropical Storm Andrew. On June 9, Andrew would later be absorbed by a larger low pressure system. On June 23, the season's first hurricane formed; Bonnie, although it attained hurricane status on June 25, just two days after Bonnie's formation. Two more tropical depressions followed suit later in the season. On August 13, the season's fifth tropical depression formed and would later become Hurricane Charley four days later. After Charley dissipated, two more tropical depressions formed on August 31 and September 1. Both dissipated on September 4. On September 7, Tropical Storm Danielle formed and would dissipate on September 10. Just after Danielle dissipated, Hurricane Earl formed and would later become the strongest system of the 1986 Atlantic hurricane season, peaking as a 105 mph Category 2 hurricane and 979 mbars in lowest pressure. No tropical cyclones formed during the months of October and the first half of November. That is, until Hurricane Frances became the latest sixth named storm on record since tropical cyclones were first named in 1950. The season came to a close on November 21, which was when Frances dissipated.

== Seasonal forecasts ==
Predictions of tropical activity in the 1986 season
Source	Date	Named storms	Hurricanes	Major hurricanes	Ref
Average (1981–2010)		12.1	6.4	2.7
Record high activity		30	15	7†
Record low activity		1	0†	0†
WRC	Early 1986	11	5	N/A
CSU	May 29, 1986	8	4	N/A
CSU	July 28, 1986	7	4	N/A
Actual activity		6	4	0

Forecasts of hurricane activity are issued before each hurricane season by noted hurricane experts such as Dr. William M. Gray and his associates at Colorado State University (CSU). A normal season, as defined by the National Oceanic and Atmospheric Administration (NOAA) in the period from 1981 to 2010, has approximately twelve named storms, with six of those reaching hurricane status. About three hurricanes strengthen into major hurricanes, which are tropical cyclones that reach at least Category 3 intensity on the Saffir–Simpson scale. In early 1986, the Weather Research Center (WRC) predicted eleven tropical storms and five hurricanes.

CSU issued forecasts on May 29 and July 28 indicating within both forecasts the anticipation of a below normal hurricane season, the former citing the absence of an El Niño event and eastward winds associated with the quasi-biennial oscillation. In May, a total of 8 named storms were expected, with four hurricanes expected, 15 days with hurricanes, and a total of 35 days with a tropical storm active in the northern Atlantic Ocean. In July, the numbers were dropped to a total of 7 named storms, 4 hurricanes, 10 hurricane days, and 25 days with a named tropical storm, which almost perfectly verified. CSU lowered their numbers from the previous prediction after data indicated high sea-level pressure anomalies over the Caribbean Sea and Gulf of Mexico and westward-oriented zonal wind anomalies, both of which favored less tropical cyclone activity.

== Season summary ==
June

June 1

- 0000 UTC (8:00 p.m. EDT May 31) – The 1986 Atlantic hurricane season officially begins.

June 5

- 0000 UTC (8:00 p.m. EDT June 4) – Subtropical Depression One formed near the Bahamas.

June 6

- 0000 UTC (8:00 p.m. EDT June 5) – Subtropical Depression One acquired tropical characteristics and strengthened into Tropical Storm Andrew.

June 7

- 1200 UTC (8:00 a.m. EDT June 6) – Tropical Storm Andrew attained its peak intensity with maximum sustained winds of 50 mph (80 km/h) and a minimum barometric pressure of 999 mbar (29.5 inHg).

June 9

- 0000 UTC (8:00 p.m. EDT June 8) – Tropical Storm Andrew was absorbed by a low pressure system.

June 23

- 1800 UTC (1:00 p.m. CDT) – Tropical Depression Two formed in the eastern Gulf of Mexico.

June 24

- 1800 UTC (1:00 p.m. CDT) – Tropical Depression Two strengthened into Tropical Storm Bonnie.

June 25

- 1800 UTC (1:00 p.m. CDT) – Tropical Storm Bonnie strengthened into Category 1 hurricane.

June 26

- 0900 UTC (4:00 a.m. CDT) – Hurricane Bonnie attained its peak intensity with winds of 85 mph (135 km/h) and a minimum pressure of 990 mbar (hPa; 29.23 inHg).
- 1000 UTC (5:00 a.m. CDT) – Hurricane Bonnie made landfall near High Island, Texas with winds of 85 mph (135 km/h).
- 1800 UTC (1:00 p.m. CDT) – Hurricane Bonnie weakened back to a tropical storm.

June 27

- 0000 UTC (7:00 p.m. CDT June 26) – Tropical Storm Bonnie weakened back to a tropical depression.

June 28

- 1200 UTC (7:00 a.m. CDT) - Tropical Depression Bonnie dissipated in Missouri.
July

July 23

- 1200 UTC (8:00 a.m. EDT) – Tropical Depression Three formed 180 miles (290 km) north of Bermuda.

July 28

- 1200 UTC (8:00 a.m. EDT) – Tropical Depression Three dissipated.
August

August 4

- 0600 UTC (1 a.m. CST) – A tropical depression developed in the western Gulf of Mexico.

August 5

- 1200–1800 UTC (7:00 a.m.–1:00 p.m. CST) – The tropical depression made landfall in North Padre Island, Texas.
- 1800 UTC (1:00 p.m. CST) – The tropical depression dissipated over southern Texas.

August 13

- 1200 UTC (8:00 a.m. EDT) – A subtropical depression formed over the Florida Panhandle.

August 15

- 1200 UTC (8:00 a.m. EDT) – The subtropical depression transitioned into a tropical depression 70 miles (110 km) southeast of Charleston, South Carolina.
- 1200 UTC (2:00 p.m. EDT) – The tropical depression strengthened into Tropical Storm Charley.

August 17

- 1200 UTC (8:00 a.m. EDT) – Tropical Storm Charley strengthened into Category 1 hurricane.
- 1400 UTC (10:00 a.m. EDT) – Hurricane Charley made landfall near Cape Fear, North Carolina with winds of 75 mph (120 km/h).
- 2200 UTC (6:00 p.m. EDT) – Hurricane Charley attained its peak intensity with maximum sustained winds of 75 mph (120 km/h) and a minimum barometric pressure of 987 mbar (29.1 inHg).

August 18

- 1200 UTC (8:00 a.m. EDT) – Hurricane Charley weakened back to a tropical storm.

August 21

- 0000 UTC (8:00 p.m. EDT) – Tropical Storm Charley transitioned into an extratropical storm.

August 30

- 1200 UTC (8:00 a.m. EDT) – Tropical Depression Five formed in the mid-Atlantic.
September

September 1

- 1200 UTC (8:00 a.m. EDT) – Tropical Depression Six formed in the Gulf of Mexico.

September 4

- Around 0600 UTC (1:00 a.m. CST) – Tropical Depression Six made landfall near Altamira, Tamaulipas, Mexico.
- 1200 UTC (8:00 a.m. EDT) – Tropical Depression Five dissipated east-southeast of Bermuda.
- 1200 UTC (7:00 a.m. EDT) – Tropical Depression Six dissipated over Mexico.

September 7

- 2:00 a.m. EDT (0600 UTC) - Tropical Depression Seven formed several hundred miles east of the Windward Islands.
- 2:00 p.m. EDT (1800 UTC) - Tropical Depression Seven strengthened into Tropical Storm Danielle.

September 8

- 0600 UTC (2:00 a.m. EDT) – Tropical Storm Danielle attained its peak intensity with maximum sustained winds of 60 mph (95 km/h) and a minimum barometric pressure of 1,000 mbar (30 inHg).

September 9

- 1800 UTC (2:00 p.m. EDT) – Tropical Storm Danielle weakened back to a tropical depression.

September 10

- 1200 UTC (8:00 a.m. EDT) – Tropical Depression Danielle dissipated in the western Caribbean.
- 1800 UTC (2:00 p.m. EDT) – Tropical Depression Eight developed 1,240 miles (2,000 km) east-northeast of Puerto Rico.

September 11

- 0000 UTC (8:00 p.m. EDT September 10) – Tropical Depression Eight strengthened into Tropical Storm Earl.
- 1800 UTC (2:00 p.m. EDT) – Tropical Storm Earl strengthened into a Category 1 hurricane.

September 12

- 1200 UTC (8:00 a.m. EDT) – Hurricane Earl strengthened into a Category 2 hurricane.

September 14

- 1200 UTC (8:00 a.m. EDT) – Hurricane Earl attained its peak intensity with maximum sustained winds of 105 mph (170 km/h) and a minimum barometric pressure of 979 mbar (28.9 inHg).

September 16

- 0000 UTC (8:00 p.m. EDT September 15) – Hurricane Earl weakened back to a Category 1 hurricane.

September 19

- 0000 UTC (98:00 p.m. EDT September 18) – Hurricane Earl transitioned into an extratropical cyclone.
October
- There was no tropical cyclone activity in the Atlantic basin during October 1986.
November

November 18

- 1800 UTC (2:00 p.m. EDT) – Tropical Depression Nine formed north of the Leeward Islands.

November 19

- 0600 UTC (2:00 a.m. EDT) – Tropical Depression Nine strengthened into Tropical Storm Frances.

November 20

- 0600 UTC (2:00 a.m. EDT) – Tropical Storm Frances strengthened into a Category 1 hurricane.
- 1200 UTC (8:00 a.m. EDT) – Hurricane Frances attained its peak intensity with maximum sustained winds of 85 mph (135 km/h) and a minimum pressure of 1,000 mbar (30 inHg).

November 21

- 1200 UTC (8:00 a.m. EDT) – Hurricane Frances weakened back into a tropical storm.

November 22

- 0000 UTC (8:00 p.m. EDT) – Tropical Storm Frances merged with an extratropical storm.

November 30

- 2359 UTC (7:59 p.m. EDT) – The 1986 Atlantic hurricane season officially ended.

The season's activity was reflected with a cumulative accumulated cyclone energy (ACE) rating of 36, which is classified as "below normal". ACE is, broadly speaking, a measure of the power of the hurricane multiplied by the length of time it existed, so storms that last a long time, as well as particularly strong hurricanes, have high ACEs. ACE is only calculated for full advisories on tropical systems at or exceeding 34 knots (39 mph; 63 km/h) or tropical storm strength. Subtropical cyclones are excluded from the total.

== Systems ==
=== Tropical Storm Andrew ===
- Tropical storm (SSHWS)
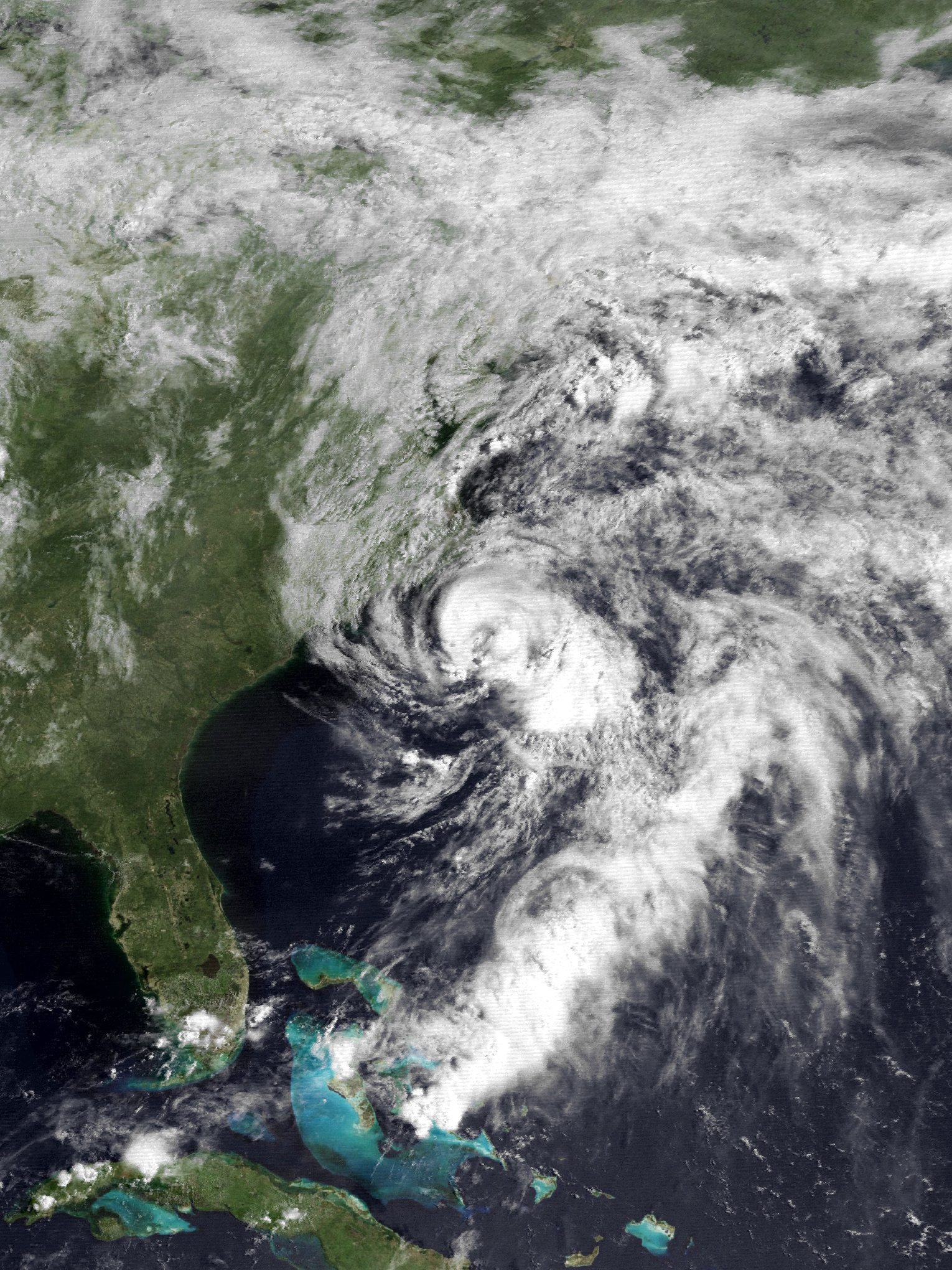
- Duration: June 5 – June 8
- Peak intensity: 50 mph (85 km/h) (1-min); 999 mbar (hPa)

In early June, a large area of disturbed weather persisted over the Greater Antilles, bringing heavy rains to the islands. The area moved northward, developing a circulation over the Bahamas. Strong upper-level winds caused the structure to resemble a subtropical cyclone, and as a result, the system was classified as a subtropical depression on June 5. The depression moved to the northwest and transitioned into a tropical storm on June 6; it was named Andrew about 260 mi (420 km) southeast of Charleston, South Carolina. The storm approached the South Carolina coast within 115 mi (185 km) before recurving to the northeast on June 7. The storm passed within 70 mi (115 km) of Cape Hatteras while near its peak intensity with winds of 50 mph (85 km/h) and a minimum pressure of 999 mbar (29.5 inHg). Andrew accelerated northeastward and briefly crossed into the forecasting territory of Environment Canada. before being absorbed by a low pressure system over Canada on June 8.

While active, Andrew posed a threat to the Carolinas. Gale warnings were posted from Cape Lookout, North Carolina, to south of Virginia Beach, Virginia, on June 7. Waves reached heights of 12-foot (3.7 m) off the coast of the Carolinas, which killed a person on Ocracoke Island. Three companions were also swept out, all of whom made it back to shore. At Wrightsville Beach and Carolina Beach, at least 40 swimmers were caught in the currents, four of whom were hospitalized. The precursor to the storm produced heavy rainfall across Jamaica that caused a deadly flood event.

=== Hurricane Bonnie ===
- Category 1 hurricane (SSHWS)
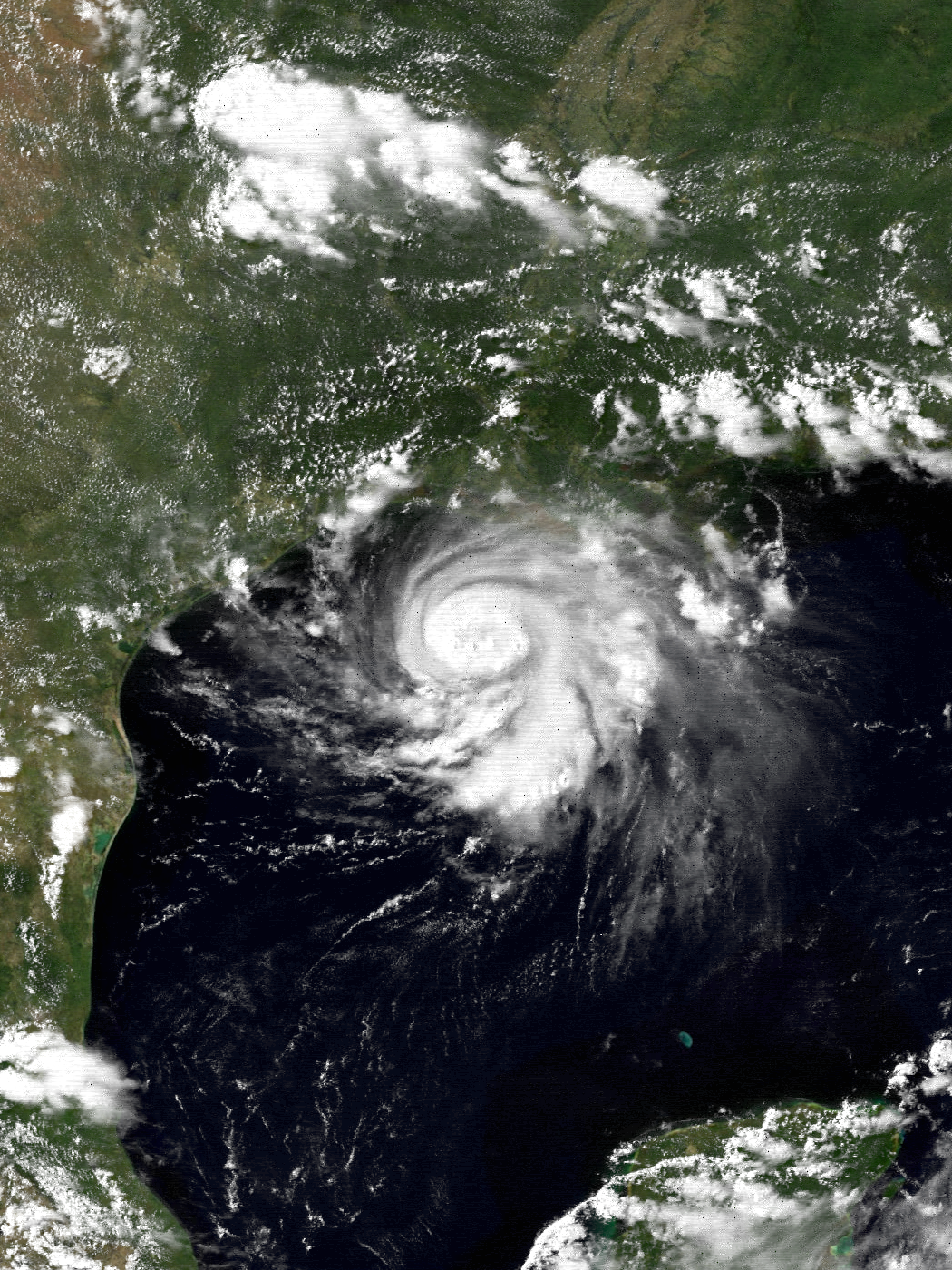
- Duration: June 23 – June 28
- Peak intensity: 85 mph (140 km/h) (1-min); 990 mbar (hPa)

During late June, a frontal trough drifted into the northeastern Gulf of Mexico, and by June 22, a surface circulation formed. Tracking west-northwestward, it developed into Tropical Depression Two on June 23 while located about 330 mi (530 km) south of Pensacola, Florida. The next day, it attained tropical storm status, and with continued favorable conditions attained hurricane status on June 25 to the south of Louisiana. Peaking with winds of 85 mph (140 km/h) early on June 26, Bonnie turned to the northwest and made landfall near Sea Rim State Park in Texas, with a barometric pressure of 990 mbar (29 inHg). The storm quickly weakened over land as it turned to the north and northeast, and on June 28, Bonnie was absorbed by an approaching frontal zone in southeastern Missouri.

Prior to moving ashore, 22,000 people were evacuated. Upon making landfall, Bonnie produced a storm surge peaking at 5.2 ft (1.6 m) at Sabine Pass. Rainfall from the storm peaked at 13 in (330 mm) in Ace, Texas, which caused some street flooding and destroyed a small dam in Liberty County. The hurricane also spawned eleven tornadoes, which, in combination with moderate winds, destroyed about 25 residences in southwestern Louisiana. Farther north, flooding damaged 507 homes and 20 businesses in Bossier, Caddo, and northern DeSoto parishes combined. Three deaths occurred in the Port Arthur, Texas, area; two from separate car accidents and another after a partially paralyzed woman died in a house fire. Bonnie caused damage totaling approximately $42 million.

=== Tropical Depression Three ===
- Tropical depression (SSHWS)
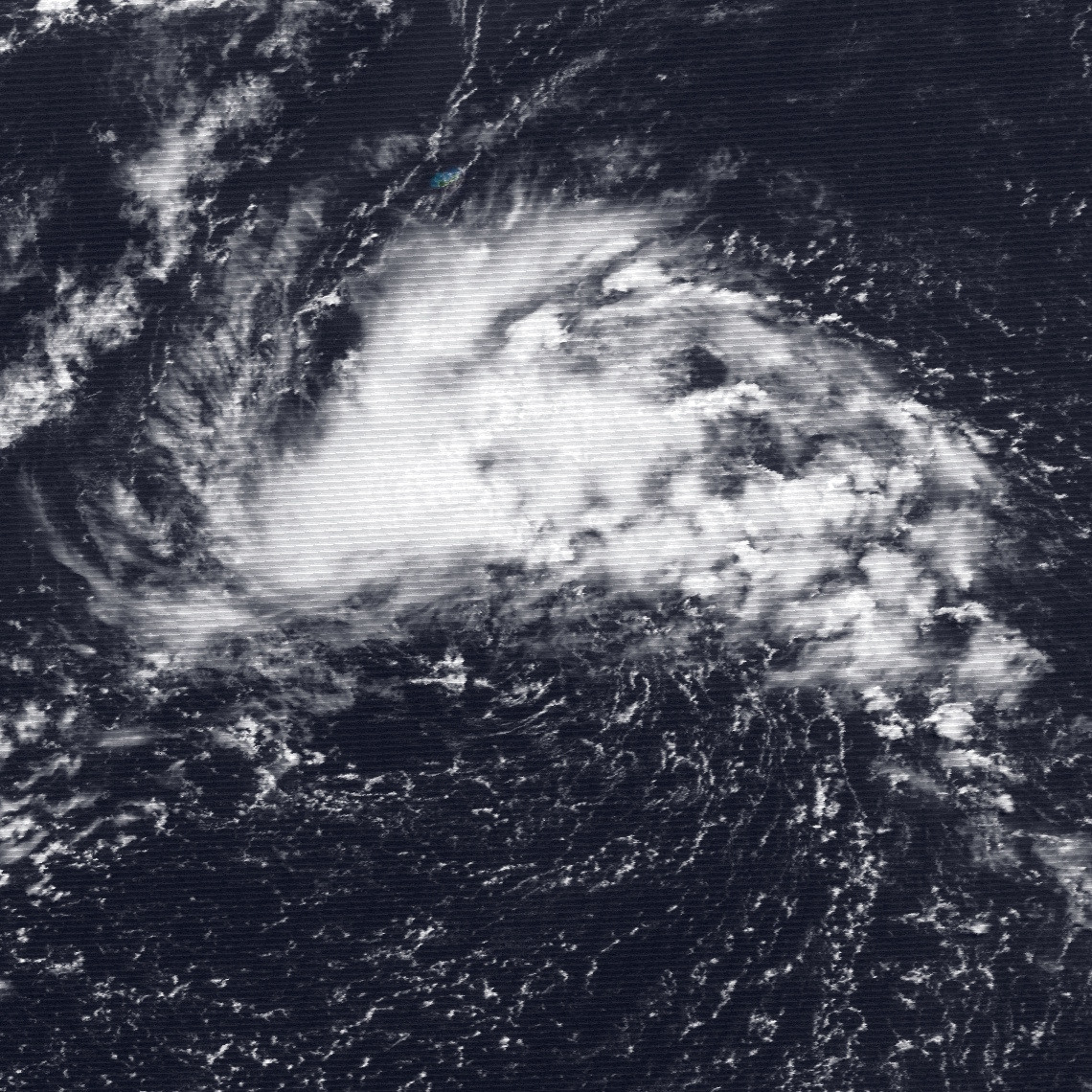
- Duration: July 23 – July 28
- Peak intensity: 35 mph (55 km/h) (1-min); 1012 mbar (hPa)

The third tropical depression of the season was detected early on July 23 in the open waters of the Atlantic, southeast of Bermuda. While about 180 mi (290 km) north of the island on July 27, the storm was moving northward at 15 mph (24 km/h) while winds were about 30 mph (50 km/h), after maintaining sustained winds of 35 mph (55 km/h) on the previous two days. Later that afternoon, aircraft reconnaissance found no well-defined circulation and the storm's status was reduced from a depression. The depression never threatened any land areas.

=== Unnumbered tropical depression ===
- Tropical depression (SSHWS)
- Duration: August 4 – August 5
- Peak intensity: 35 mph (55 km/h) (1-min); 1012 mbar (hPa)

A tropical disturbance was detected on August 4 in the northwestern Gulf of Mexico along the lower Texas coast. The low-pressure system moved slowly toward land, limiting the system's development. On August 5, the system became organized enough to be considered a tropical depression. The storm moved inland overnight, dumping several inches of rain over South Texas and causing street flooding in Brownsville and nearby South Padre Island. The system caused rainfall up to 4.45 in (113 mm) in some areas but had no major problems attributed to it. This storm was not carried as a depression operationally, and thus has no assigned number.

=== Hurricane Charley ===
- Category 1 hurricane (SSHWS)
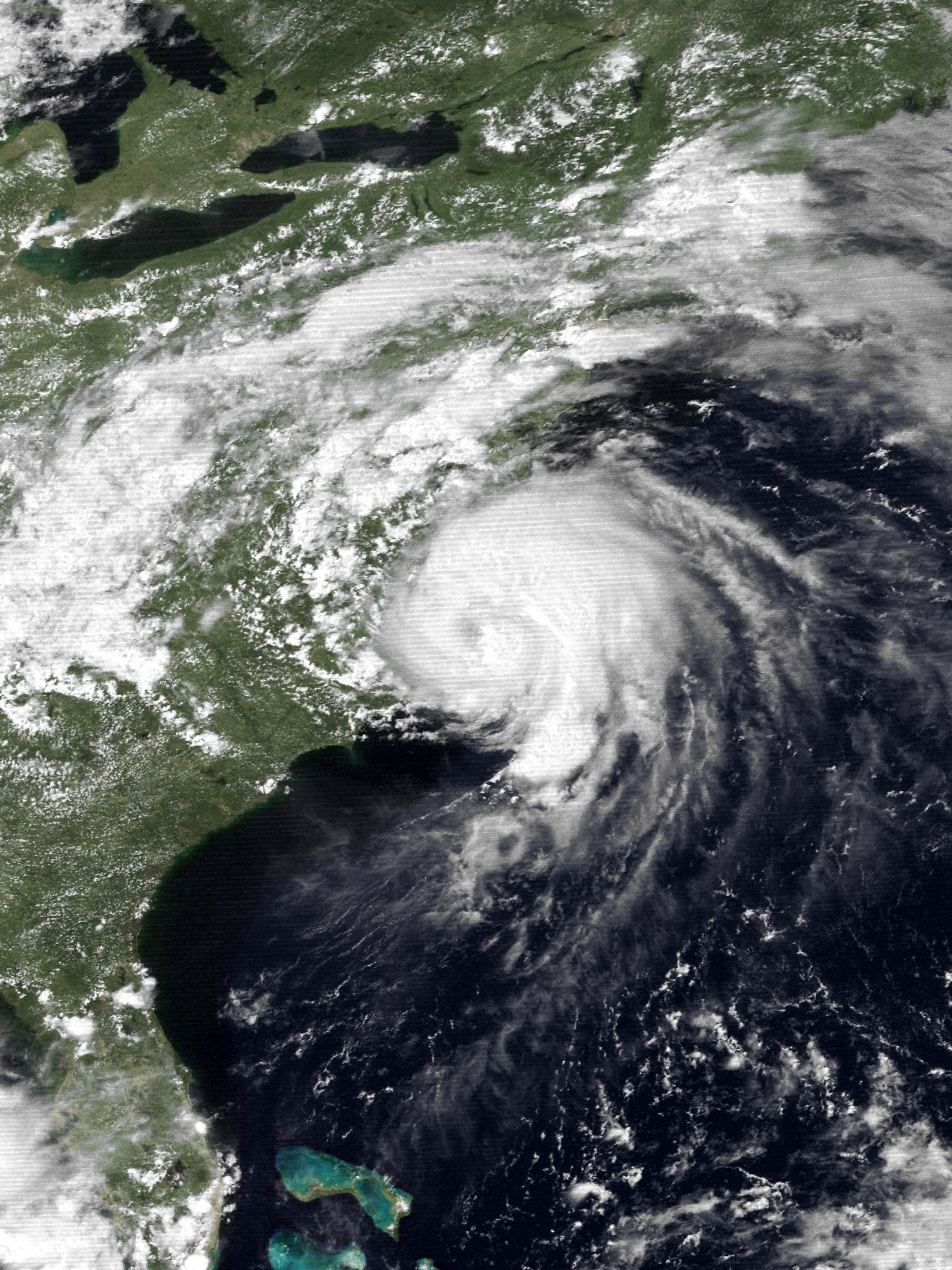
- Duration: August 13 – August 20
- Peak intensity: 80 mph (130 km/h) (1-min); 987 mbar (hPa)

A trough of low pressure persisted over Florida on August 11. After organizing and merging with a decaying frontal trough, a subtropical depression formed on August 13 near the mouth of the Aucilla River. The weak storm initially moved northeastward and then eastward, emerging into the Atlantic near Hilton Head Island, South Carolina, on August 15. That day, the system transitioned into a tropical cyclone and intensified into a tropical storm off the coast of South Carolina. Charley attained hurricane status on August 17, just before making landfall in North Carolina near Cape Lookout. After reemerging into the Atlantic near the North Carolina–Virginia state line early on August 18, Charley peaked with winds of 80 mph (130 km/h) and a minimum pressure of 987 mbar (29.1 inHg). It then gradually weakened over the north Atlantic before transitioning into an extratropical cyclone about 225 mi (360 km) southeast of Sable Island, Nova Scotia, though its remnants remained identifiable for over a week until after crossing the British Isles and dissipating on August 30.

The storm brought light to moderate rains along its path through the southeastern United States, alleviating drought conditions in Georgia and South Carolina. In North Carolina, tidal flooding and downed trees were the primary impact. The storm brought high winds to southeastern Virginia, where 110,000 people lost power. Minor damage extended along the Atlantic coastline northward through Massachusetts. Charley caused about $15 million in damage in the United States and five deaths, all due to indirect causes. One person drowned in Newfoundland. The extratropical remnants of Charley brought heavy rainfall and strong winds to the British Isles, causing at least 11 deaths. In Ireland, the rainfall set records for 24‑hour totals, including an accumulation of more than 7.8 in (200 mm), which remains the highest daily precipitation total in the country. Consequently, widespread flooding occurred, with two rivers overflowing their banks. In the Dublin area, 451 buildings were flooded, some up to a depth of 8 ft (2.4 m). In the United Kingdom, the storm downed trees and power lines, as well as flooded rivers.

=== Tropical Depression Five ===
- Tropical depression (SSHWS)
- Duration: August 30 – September 4
- Peak intensity: 35 mph (55 km/h) (1-min); 1016 mbar (hPa)

This tropical depression formed in the eastern tropical Atlantic Ocean on August 31. The depression moved west-northwest, then northwest away from the Caribbean Sea without further development before dissipating east-southeast of Bermuda on September 4.

=== Tropical Depression Six ===
- Tropical depression (SSHWS)
- Duration: September 1 – September 4
- Peak intensity: 35 mph (55 km/h) (1-min); 1003 mbar (hPa)

A tropical wave crossed the Caribbean sea, moving into a favorable upper environment in the western Caribbean sea on August 31. The system formed into a weak tropical depression before crossing the Yucatán peninsula, becoming better organized as it moved into the south-central and western Gulf of Mexico between September 1 and 3. The system moved ashore east-central Mexico before quickly dissipating as a tropical cyclone on September 4. Satellite imagery revealed that its residual cloud pattern persisted over Mexico for an additional couple of days before degenerating. Heavy rainfall fell primarily north of its track, with the maximum across northeast Mexico falling at El Barranco/Altamira, where a total of 9.33 inches (237 mm) was measured.

=== Tropical Storm Danielle ===
- Tropical storm (SSHWS)
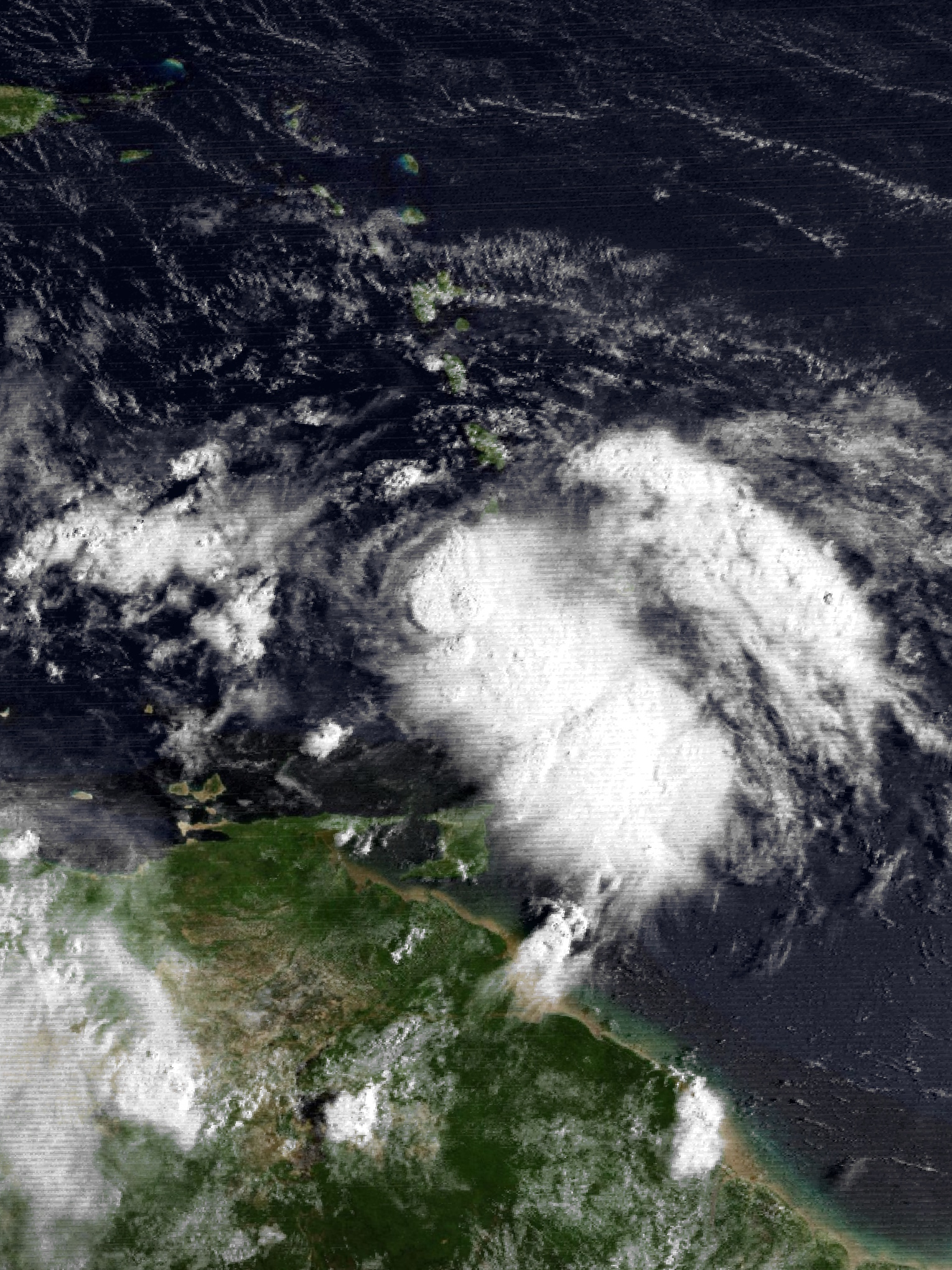
- Duration: September 7 – September 10
- Peak intensity: 60 mph (95 km/h) (1-min); 1000 mbar (hPa)

Around September 1, a tropical wave exited western Africa and proceeded westward. A tropical depression developed along the tropical wave early on September 7, located about 350 mi (565 km) north-northeast of the Suriname-French Guiana border. Satellite imagery indicated that it quickly intensified into Tropical Storm Danielle about 385 mi (620 km) east-southeast of Grenada. On September 8, Hurricane Hunters flew into Tropical Storm Danielle and reported maximum sustained winds of 60 mph (95 km/h), as well as a pressure of 1,000 millibars (30 inHg). The flight also observed wind gusts up to hurricane-force. On September 8, Danielle moved through the Windward Islands and entered the Caribbean Sea, where it weakened due to entrainment of dry air from northern South America. The circulation became dislocated from the convection. Late on September 9, the system weakened to tropical depression status, and the next day it dissipated in the western Caribbean.

As Danielle moved through the Lesser Antilles, it produced wind gusts to near hurricane-force on Saint Vincent, which destroyed the roofs of more than 30 houses and caused a power outage. The combination of winds and heavy rains caused heavy crop damage. Twelve days after Danielle struck, another rainstorm affected Saint Vincent and the Grenadines. The two storms damaged 436 buildings, including 100 that were destroyed, while also killing 120 animals and triggering landslides. Damage from the two storms totaled $9.3 million in the country. On Barbados, 12 homes were destroyed. Wind gusts reached 40 mph (64 km/h) in Bridgetown. A coast guard ship required rescue after it ran aground into a reef in the southern Grenadines. Further south, rainbands from Danielle swept through Trinidad and Tobago, producing up to 4 feet (1.2 m) of flooding. The flooding caused 27 landslides and destroyed 4 bridges. Damage in the country was estimated at $8 million (1986 TTD, $1.2 million 1986 USD). The storm also led to a tropical storm watch on Jamaica, where officials evacuated fishermen from two small islands as a precaution.

=== Hurricane Earl ===
- Category 2 hurricane (SSHWS)
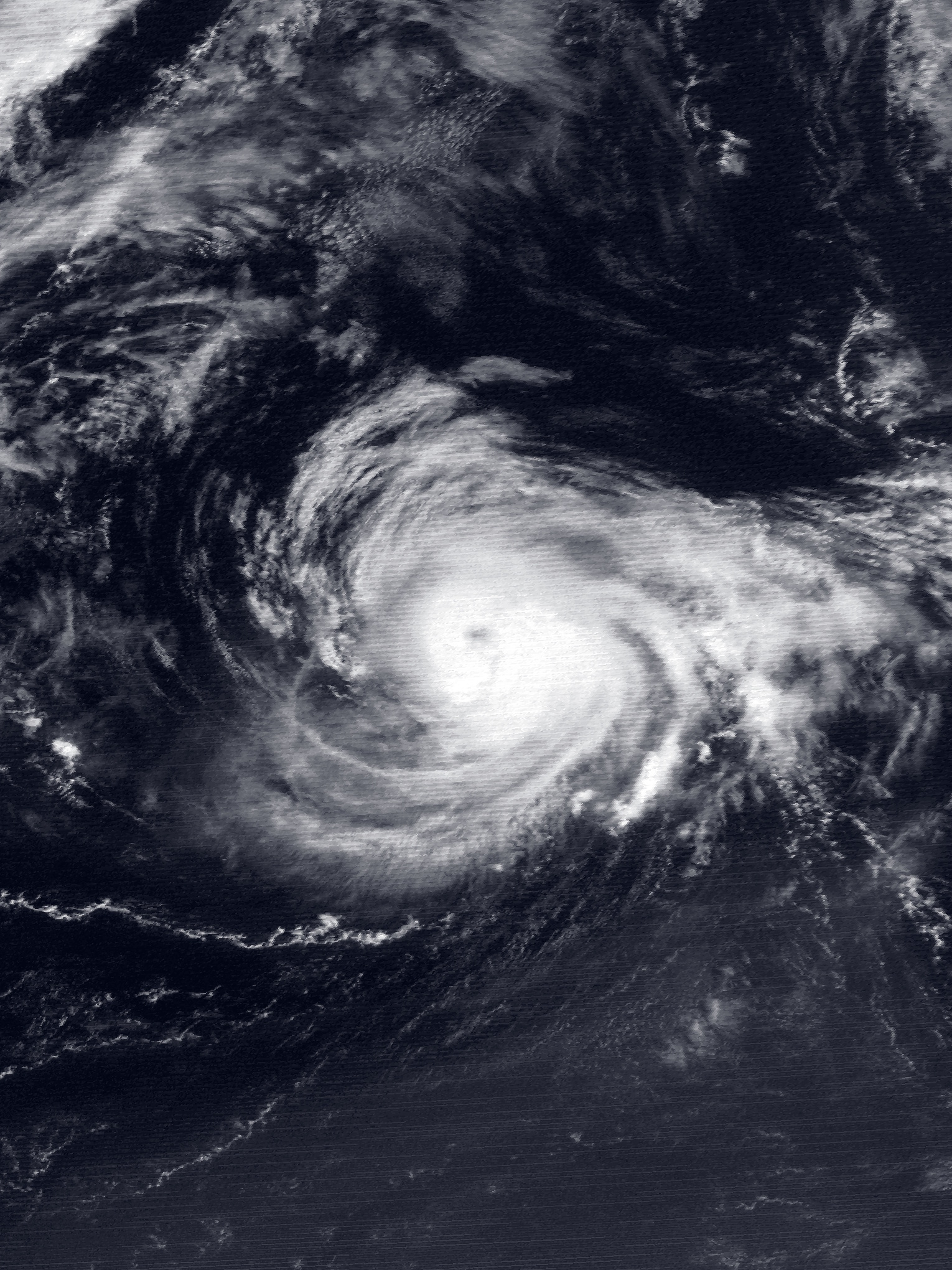
- Duration: September 10 – September 18
- Peak intensity: 105 mph (165 km/h) (1-min); 979 mbar (hPa)

The strongest storm of the season began as a tropical wave that moved off the west coast of Africa on September 4. After moving across the Atlantic, the wave developed into Tropical Depression Eight at 18:00 UTC on September 10 while about 1,240 mi (1,995 km) east of Puerto Rico. The depression strengthened into Tropical Storm Earl six hours later as it moved northwestward in response to an approaching frontal trough. By late on September 10, Earl intensified into a hurricane and then reached Category 2 intensity on September 12. Earl turned north on September 13, east on the following day, and southeast on September 15, each recurvature likely the result of low to mid-level pressure patterns. The hurricane peaked with winds of 105 mph (165 km/h) and a minimum pressure of 979 mbar (28.9 inHg) at 12:00 UTC on September 14. Earl weakened to a Category 1 hurricane on September 16 and turned northwestward due to a combination of a deepening upper trough and its associated surface low-pressure center and a cold front moving offshore the Northeastern United States. The upper trough and a high-pressure system caused Earl to accelerate north-northeastward beginning on September 17. Late on the following day, Earl became extratropical about 385 mi (620 km) southeast of Cape Race, Newfoundland, while the remnants persisted until September 19.

=== Hurricane Frances ===
- Category 1 hurricane (SSHWS)
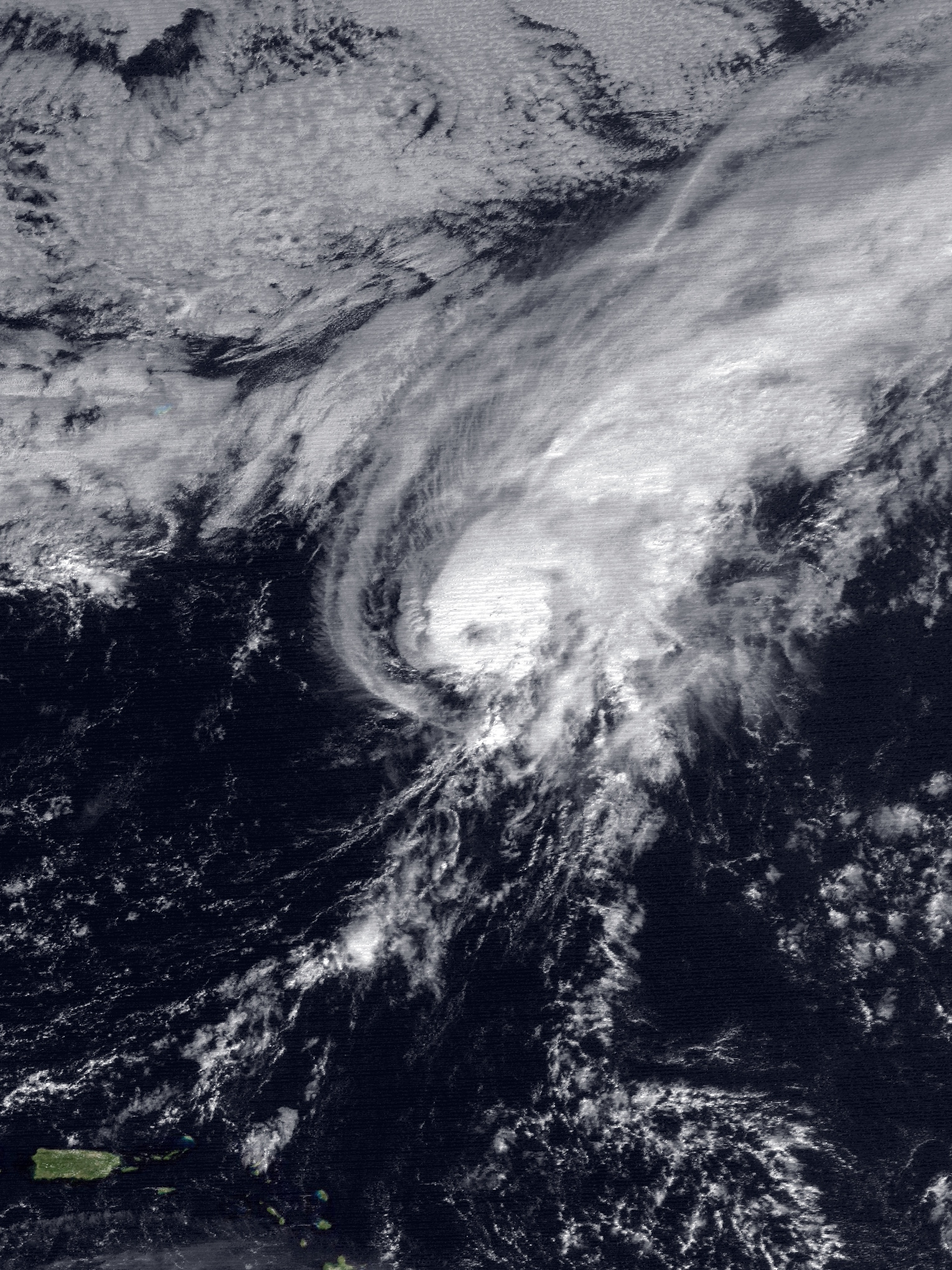
- Duration: November 18 – November 21
- Peak intensity: 85 mph (140 km/h) (1-min); 1000 mbar (hPa)

Satellite imagery indicated the presence of an area of showers and thunderstorms near the Lesser Antilles on November 15. A cloud circulation formed two days later and headed north-northwestward, developing into a tropical depression at 18:00 UTC on November 18 approximately 315 mi (505 km) north of the Lesser Antilles. Early on the following day, the depression intensified into Tropical Storm Frances, based on a ship reporting winds of 40 mph (65 km/h). Frances turned northeastward on November 19 and strengthened into a hurricane on the following day, shortly before peaking with maximum sustained winds of 85 mph (140 km/h) and a minimum pressure of 1,000 mbar (30 inHg). The hurricane turned northward on November 21 and weakened to a tropical storm. Later that day, Frances merged with an extratropical low while located about 410 mi (660 km) east-southeast of Bermuda.

== Storm names ==
The following list of names was used for named storms that formed in the North Atlantic in 1986. This is the same list used for the 1980 season except for Andrew, which replaced Allen, and was used for the first time in 1986. No names were retired from this list following the season, and it was used again for the 1992 season.

- Andrew
- Bonnie
- Charley
- Danielle
- Earl
- Frances
- Georges (unused)
- Hermine (unused)
- Ivan (unused)
- Jeanne (unused)
- Karl (unused)
- Lisa (unused)
- Mitch (unused)
- Nicole (unused)
- Otto (unused)
- Paula (unused)
- Richard (unused)
- Shary (unused)
- Tomas (unused)
- Virginie (unused)
- Walter (unused)

== Season effects ==
This is a table of all of the tropical cyclones that formed in the 1986 Atlantic hurricane season. It includes their name, duration, peak classification and intensities, areas affected, damage, and death totals. Deaths in parentheses are additional and indirect (an example of an indirect death would be a traffic accident), but were still related to that storm. Damage and deaths include totals while the storm was extratropical, a wave, or a low, and all of the damage figures are in 1986 USD.

1986 North Atlantic tropical cyclone season statistics
Storm name	Dates active	Storm category at peak intensity	Max 1-min wind mph (km/h)	Min. press. (mbar)	Areas affected	Damage (US$)	Deaths	Ref(s).
Andrew	June 5–8	Tropical storm	50 (85)	999	The Carolinas	Minimal	1	
Bonnie	June 23–28	Category 1 hurricane	85 (140)	990	Texas, Louisiana, Southeastern United States	$42 million	4 (1)	
Three	July 23–28	Tropical depression	35 (55)	1012	None	None	None	
Unnumbered	August 4–5	Tropical depression	35 (55)	1012	None	None	None	
Charley	August 13–20	Category 1 hurricane	80 (130)	987	Southeastern United States, Mid-Atlantic, Massachusetts, Ireland, United Kingdom	>$15 million	15	
Five	August 30 – September 4	Tropical depression	35 (55)	1016	None	None	None	
Six	September 1–4	Tropical depression	35 (55)	1003	Yucatan Peninsula, Northeast Mexico	None	None	
Danielle	September 7–10	Tropical storm	60 (95)	1000	Leeward Islands	$10.5 million	None	
Earl	September 26 – October 3	Category 2 hurricane	105 (165)	979	None	None	None	
Frances	November 18–21	Category 1 hurricane	85 (140)	1000	None	None	None	
Season aggregates
10 systems	June 5 – November 21		105 (165)	979		.$67.5 million	20 (1)	

== See also ==
- 1986 Pacific hurricane season
- 1986 Pacific typhoon season
- 1986 North Indian Ocean cyclone season
- South-West Indian Ocean cyclone seasons: 1985–86, 1986–87
- Australian region cyclone seasons: 1985–86, 1986–87
- South Pacific cyclone seasons: 1985–86, 1986–87
- South Atlantic tropical cyclone
- Mediterranean tropical-like cyclone
