= Flagg Ranch =

Coordinates: 44°06′22.36″N 110°10′03.42″W

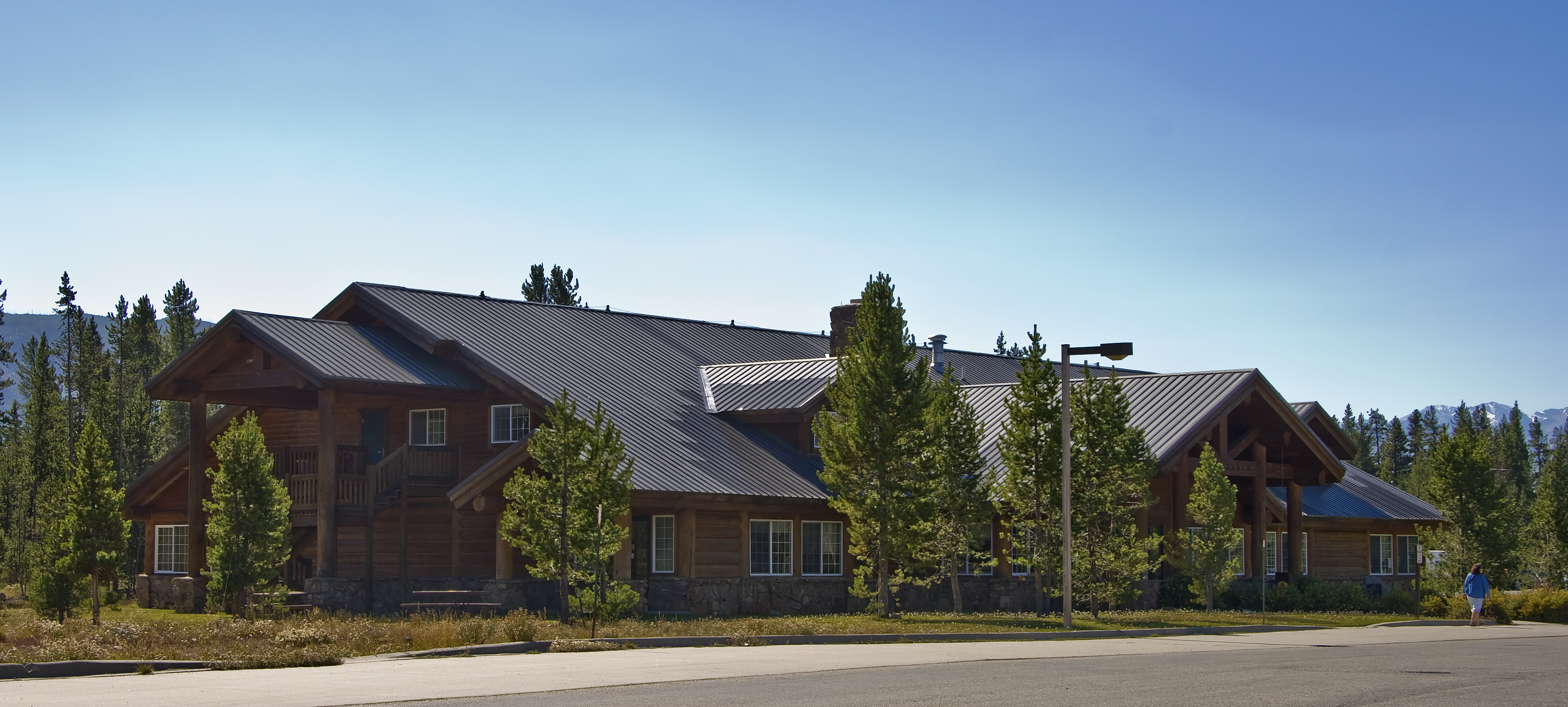
Flagg Ranch main lodge

Flagg Ranch is a privately operated resort located in the John D. Rockefeller Jr. Memorial Parkway corridor between Yellowstone National Park and Grand Teton National Park in northwestern Wyoming. The location was initially occupied in the 1890s by the Snake River Military Station, part of a network of U.S. Army outposts for patrol and management of Yellowstone National Park in its early years under military administration. The outpost operated under Army control until 1906, when the land to the south of the Yellowstone boundary were turned over to the U.S. Forest Service, becoming Teton National Forest in 1908. The station became a stopping point for travelers between Jackson, Wyoming and Yellowstone, easily identifiable by the flags that flew over it.

== Flagg Ranch ==
In 1910 the Flagg Ranch was established nearby by Edward S. Sheffield, who named the ranch after the old post's flags. Sheffield obtained a lease from the Forest Service and exploited hot springs along nearby Polecat Creek for bathing. Ed Sheffield was the brother of Ben Sheffield, who operated a dude ranch of his own, the Teton Lodge Resort near the Moran settlement in northern Jackson Hole. The Flagg Ranch grew along with the dude ranch and guest ranch industry as it developed in Jackson Hole, and by Sheffield's death in 1927 the Flagg Ranch was a fully equipped dude ranch. It was described as a 50-mile (80 km) stagecoach ride from Ashton, Idaho, the nearest point of connection to the Union Pacific Railroad line.

== Park Service concession ==
In 1972 the section of Teton National Forest between Yellowstone and Grand Teton was transferred to the National Park Service as John D. Rockefeller Jr. Memorial Parkway, to be operated by Grand Teton. The Flagg Ranch became a Park Service concessioner with the transfer. The ranch has been operated by International Leisure Hosts, Ltd. since 1964. Though the location is now operated by Vail Resorts Management Company (early 2000's-ish). The original log lodge was destroyed by fire in 1981. A replacement structure was completed in 1995. The Flagg Ranch area was heavily burned during the Yellowstone fires of 1988 by the Huck Fire, started by a tree falling on a power line near the ranch, which eventually covered more than 200,000 acres (81,000 ha).

== NPS information station ==
The National Park Service operates a seasonal information station at Flagg Ranch that provides information of the Rockefeller Parkway and Grand Teton and Yellowstone National Parks.
