= 1988–1989 La Niña event =

Meteorological event in the Pacific Ocean

An extremely strong La Niña developed during early 1988 and lasted until 1989. The La Niña was preceded by moderate-or-strong El Niño conditions from 1986 to very early 1988.

The North American droughts of 1988 to 1990 and strongly linked heat waves killed 4,000 to almost 17,000 people across the United States and Canada although other estimates vary on death estimates. Also, damage from this drought had been estimated next to originally $40 billion. Modern estimates, however, indicate the drought (more likely than not) caused closer to around $60 billion in the Western United States, the Great Plains and the Midwestern United States. During 1989 and 1990, though, most droughts were focused west of the Mississippi River in Nebraska, Iowa, Missouri, Kansas and Colorado. The first year of this drought (1988) was all throughout the country.

The 1988–89 La Niña events might have influenced the 1989 Atlantic hurricane season.

The North American drought was officially marked over in certain parts of the United States: August 1990 was extremely wet for Iowa, for which State the drought then ended. There were similar results for Illinois during that same month and year. In Minnesota, Nebraska, Missouri and Kansas, however, the dry conditions continued into Fall 1990.
