= John D. Rockefeller Jr. Memorial Parkway =

Scenic parkway in Wyoming, United States

- IUCN category V (protected landscape/seascape)
- Location within Wyoming Location within the United States
- Location: Teton County, Wyoming, U.S.
- Nearest city: Jackson, Wyoming
- Coordinates: 44°6′17″N 110°41′34″W
- Area: 24,000 acres (97 km^{2})
- Established: August 25, 1972
- Visitors: 1,137,117 (in 2003)
- Governing body: National Park Service
- Website: John D. Rockefeller, Jr. Memorial Parkway

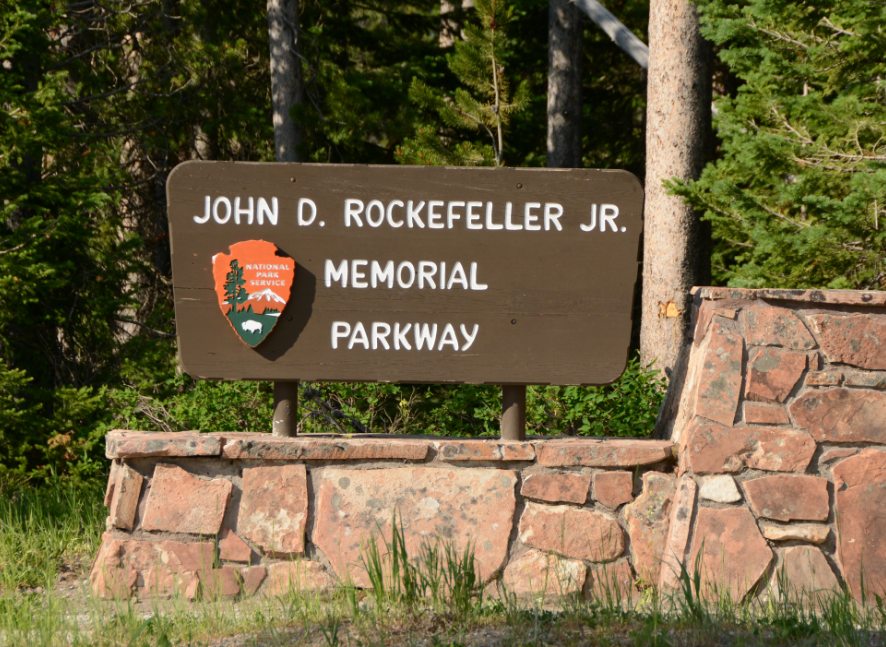
Entrance sign

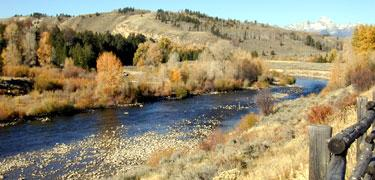
The Snake River in Wyoming

John D. Rockefeller Jr. Memorial Parkway is a scenic road and protected area that connects Grand Teton National Park and Yellowstone National Park in the U.S. state of Wyoming. It is federally owned and managed by the National Park Service by Grand Teton National Park. It is named in remembrance of John D. Rockefeller Jr., a conservationist and philanthropist who was instrumental in the creation and enlargement of numerous national parks including Grand Teton, Virgin Islands, Acadia and the Great Smoky Mountains. This parkway carries U.S. Route 89, U.S. Route 191, and U.S. Route 287

== History ==
Created in 1972 through the authorization of the United States Congress, and consisting of 24,000 acres (9,700 ha), it also borders National Forest lands and is an integral part of the Greater Yellowstone Ecosystem. Caribou-Targhee National Forest borders the parkway on the west and Bridger-Teton National Forest while the Teton Wilderness forms the eastern border.

This stretch of land was originally part of Teton National Forest and was transferred to the National Park Service from the US Forest Service to assure an unbroken connection between Grand Teton and Yellowstone National Parks. The parkway road itself extends from the northern end of Grand Teton National Park, through the parkway lands, and then on to West Thumb Geyser Basin in Yellowstone National Park, a distance of 27 miles (43 km).

== Geology ==
The parkway is a transitional zone in terms of geology with ancient lava beds being found in the north and the granitic rocks of the Teton Range in the south. The Snake River flows through the parkway as it heads south to Jackson Lake and is considered a prominent trout fly fishing area. In Grand Teton and Yellowstone, grizzly bears, black bears, moose, elk, bighorn sheep and mule deer can be found there.

The Yellowstone fires of 1988 affected the northern sections of the parkway consuming 4,000 acres (1,600 ha). As of 2005, the forest had begun to be rejuvenated and wildlife habitat had actually increased due to better mix of meadow and forest lands.

== Recreation ==
Rafting is a popular activity during the summer and guided snowmobile tours use the parkway as a staging area and launching point for guided trips into Yellowstone during the winter.

A major relocation project for the Flagg Ranch concession operation (consisting of a lodge, gas station, camp store, cabins and a campground) from along the Snake River to a point higher up and less visible from the road was completed in 2002.

== See also ==
- Rockefeller family
