= 1988–1990 North American drought =

Coordinates: 46°N 94°W

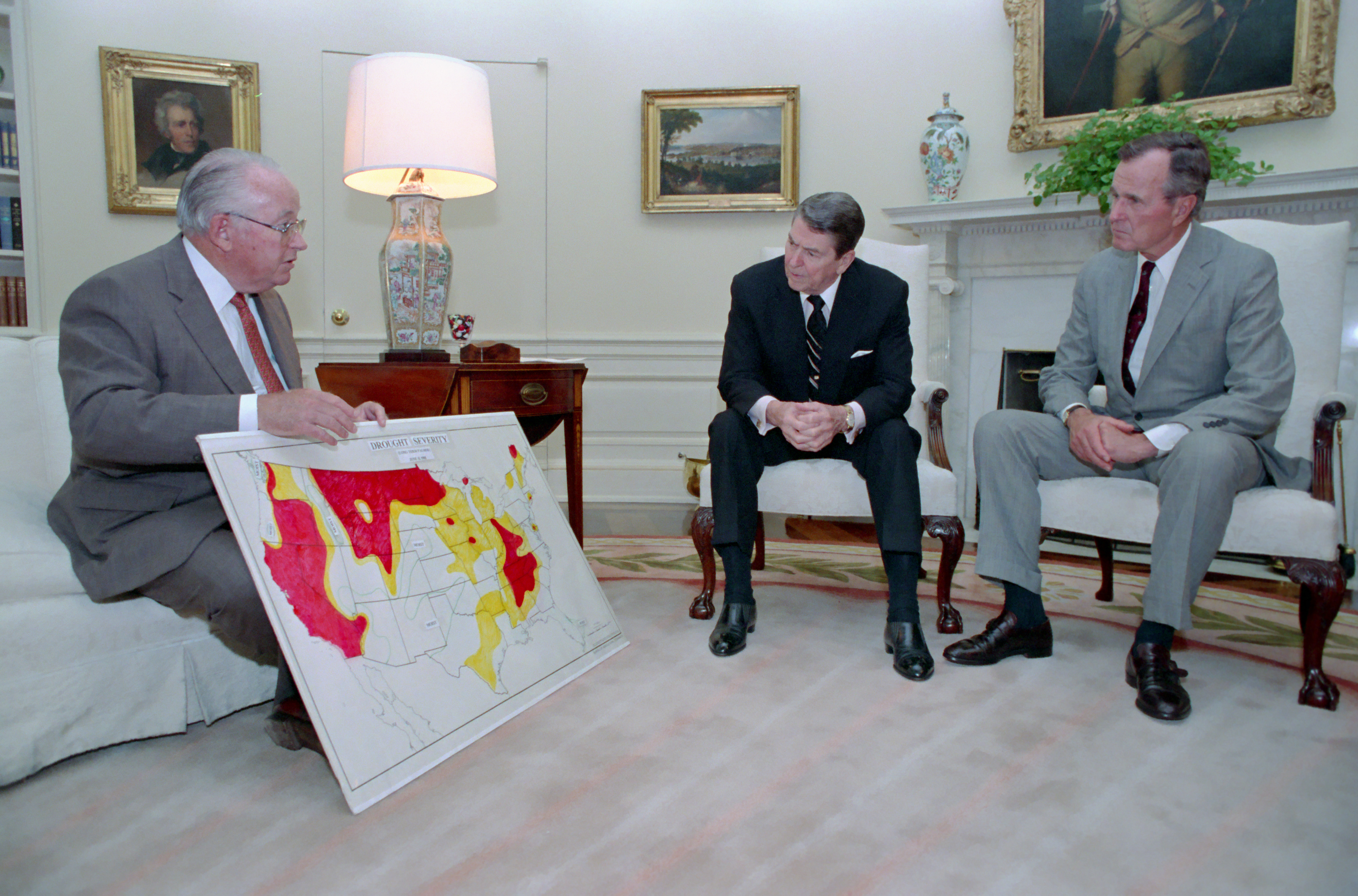
President of the United States Ronald Reagan and Vice President Bush discuss the drought with Secretary of Agriculture Lyng

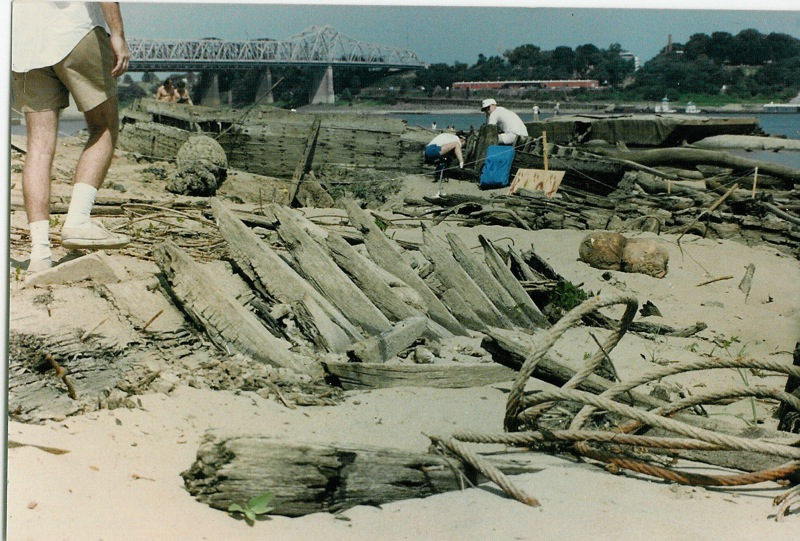
Exploration of wooden hull wrecks in the Mississippi River in Memphis, Tennessee during the drought

The 1988–1990 North American drought ranks among the worst episodes of drought in the United States. This multi-year drought began in most areas in 1988 and continued into 1989 and 1990 (in certain areas). The drought caused $60 billion in damage ($163 billion 2026 USD) in United States dollars, adjusting for inflation. The drought occasioned some of the worst blowing-dust events since 1977 or the 1930s in many locations in the Midwestern United States, including a protracted dust storm, which closed schools in South Dakota in late February 1988. During the spring, several weather stations set records for the lowest monthly total precipitation and the longest interval between measurable precipitation, for example, 55 days in a row without precipitation in Milwaukee. During the summer, two record-setting heatwaves developed, similar to those of 1934 and 1936. The concurrent heat waves killed 4,800 to 17,000 people in the United States. During the summer of 1988, the drought led to many wildfires in forested western North America, including the Yellowstone fires of 1988.

At its peak, the drought covered 45% of the United States. That was far less area than the Dust Bowl, which covered 70% of the United States, but the drought of 1988–1990 not only ranks as the costliest drought in United States history, it was one of the costliest natural disasters in United States history. In Canada, drought-related losses added to $1.8 billion (1988 Canadian dollars).

== Origin ==
The western United States experienced a lengthy drought in the late 1980s. Much of California experienced one of its longest droughts ever observed from late 1986 through late 1992. The situation worsened in 1988 as much of the United States also suffered from severe drought. In California, the six-year drought ended in late 1992 as a significant El Niño event in the Pacific Ocean (and the eruption of Mount Pinatubo in June 1991) most likely caused unusually persistent heavy rains.

Cultivation of marginally arable land, as well as pumping groundwater to near depletion contributed to the damage from this event.

== Damage ==
The drought of 1988 ranked as the worst drought since the Dust Bowl, which had occurred more than 50 years earlier. Damages in the United States (as of 2008, adjusted for inflation) were calculated at between $80 billion and almost $120 billion. The state of Minnesota alone saw $1.2 billion in crop losses. The drought caused devastation comparable to that of Hurricane Andrew in 1992 and Hurricane Katrina in 2005. In Canada, drought-related losses totaled $1.8 billion (in 1988 Canadian dollars).

Following a milder drought in the southeastern United States and California the previous year, the 1988–1989 drought affected the Mid-Atlantic states, the southeastern United States, the midwestern United States, the northern Great Plains, and the western United States. Heatwaves that accompanied the drought are estimated to have killed over 5,000 Americans as well as livestock across the United States. The drought destroyed crops almost nationwide, lawns went brown, and many cities declared water restrictions. More than four inches (100 mm) of helpful rain was brought to parts of the Midwest in September 1988 by Hurricane Gilbert, which crossed Texas and Oklahoma as a tropical depression, weakening as it moved further north into Missouri, and spreading rain as far as the Great Lakes. In some areas Hurricane Gilbert overcame the drought outright, but other locations were at −6 or lower on the Palmer Drought Severity Index by early autumn 1988 and a general change in the pattern which had maintained for the preceding nine-plus months was required to ease the hydrological impacts of the drought. The agricultural damage was essentially done by this point, resulting in record prices for commodities.

Wildfires in Yellowstone National Park burned 793,880 acres (3,213 km^{2}) and altered the landscape significantly. The catastrophic drought continued across the Upper Midwest and northern Great Plains states during 1989, not officially ending until 1990. Dry conditions continued during 1989, affecting Iowa, Illinois, Missouri, parts of Nebraska, Minnesota, Kansas and large portions of Colorado. The drought also affected some parts of Canada.

Beginning in the spring, a persistent wind pattern brought hot dry air into the middle of the continent from the desert southwest, whereas in most years advection of warm and humid air from the Gulf of Mexico is the rule; therefore, despite the extremely high temperatures, elevation of apparent temperature was not as severe as would be the case during the 1995 heat wave.

== See also ==
- 1980 United States heat wave
- 1988-1990 La Niña event
