= Conny =

Conny is a given name and a surname. Notable people with the name include:

== Given name ==
=== Men ===
- Conny Andersson (footballer) (born 1945), Swedish former footballer
- Conny Andersson (racing driver) (born 1939), Swedish former racing driver
- Conny Johansson (born 1971), Swedish former football goalkeeper
- Conny Karlsson (footballer) (born 1953), Swedish football manager and former player
- Conny Karlsson (shot putter) (born 1975), Finnish shot putter
- Conny Månsson (born 1980), Swedish football goalkeeper
- Conny Nimmersjö (born 1967), Swedish musician
- Conny Öhman (1950–2010), Swedish politician
- Conny Rosén (born 1971), Swedish former football goalkeeper
- Conny Strömberg (born 1975), Swedish ice hockey player
- Conny Torstensson (born 1949), Swedish former footballer

=== Women ===
- Conny Aerts (born 1966), Belgian astrophysicist
- Conny van Bentum (born 1965), Dutch former swimmer
- Conny Helder (born 1958), Dutch healthcare manager, Minister for Long-term Care and Sport since 2022
- Conny Perrin (born 1990), Swiss tennis player
- Conny Pohlers (born 1978), German former footballer
- Conny Schmalfuss (born 1975), German diver
- Conny Waßmuth (born 1983), German sprint canoer

== Nickname ==
=== Men ===
- Conny Bauer (born 1943), German trombone player
- Conny Doyle (1862–1931), Irish-born Major League Baseball player
- Conrad Heidkamp (1905–1994), German footballer
- Conny Mus (1950–2010), Dutch journalist
- Conny Palm (1907–1951), Swedish electrical engineer and statistician
- Konrad "Conny" Plank (1940–1987) was a German record producer, musician, and sound engineer for Kraftwerk
- Conny van Rietschoten (1926–2013), Dutch yacht skipper
- Conrad Schnitzler (1937–2011), German experimental musician
- Conny Staudinger (1927–2025), Austrian ice hockey player
- Conny Varela (born 1954), Puerto Rican politician
- Conny Veit (born 1949), German musician, singer, composer and painter

=== Women ===
- Conny Nxumalo (1967–2020), South African social worker and government official
- Conny Mayer-Bonde (born 1972), German politician

== Stage name ==
- Conny Bloom, Swedish guitarist and songwriter Ulf Conny Blomqvist, (born 1964)
- Conny Méndez (1898–1979), Venezuelan composer, singer, writer, caricaturist, actress and metaphysicist
- Conny Vandenbos, Dutch singer Jacoba Adriana Hollestelle (1937–2002)
- Conny, stage name of Cornelia Froboess (born 1943), German actress

== Surname ==
- John Canoe (died c. 1725), also known as January Conny, European name given to an Ahanta chief from Axim, Ghana
- Robert Conny (1646?–1713), English physician

== See also ==
- Socker-Conny, a comic book character created by Joakim Pirinen
- Connie (disambiguation)
