= Konni =

Konni may refer to:

- Konni (dog), Russian President Vladimir Putin's dog (1999-2014)
- Konni, Kerala, a town in Kerala state in India
- Konni (Hausa state), a traditional Hausa state in south central Niger
- Birni-N'Konni (shortened to Konni), a town in Niger
- Konni language, a Gur language spoken in Ghana
- Konni Zilliacus (senior) (1855-1924), Finnish politician and writer
- Konni Zilliacus (1894-1967), UK politician
- Konni Group, a fictional Russian PMC organization appearing in the video game Call of Duty: Modern Warfare II and Call of Duty: Modern Warfare III

== See also ==
- Konnie Huq (b. 1975), British TV presenter
- Connie (disambiguation)
- Conny
- Koni (disambiguation)
