= Koni =

Koni or KONI may refer to:

== People ==
- Abdulla Koni (born 1979), Qatari former professional footballer of Senegalese descent
- Anatoly Koni (1844–1927), Russian jurist, judge, politician and writer
- Fyodor Koni (1809–1879), Russian dramatist, theatre critic and literary historian, editor and memoirist
- Koni De Winter (born 2002), Belgian professional footballer
- Koni Iguan (born 1969), Papua New Guinean politician
- Koni Lui (born 1982), Hong Kong model

=== Al-Koni ===
- Ibrahim al-Koni (born 1948), Libyan Tuareg writer
- Musa Al-Koni (born 1951), Libyan politician and diplomat

== Places ==
- Koni, Ivory Coast, town
- Koni, Komi Republic, village in Russia
- Koni Peninsula, Magadan Oblast, Russia

== Other ==
- Koni-class frigate, a class of Soviet frigates
- KONI (FM), a radio station located in Lanai City, Hawaii
- Koni or Kony (film), a 1986 Indian Bengali-language film directed by Saroj Dey
- Koni (novel), a Bengali-language novel by Indian writer Moti Nandi
- The KONI Group, a Dutch manufacturer of automobile shock absorbers and subsidiary of ITT Corporation
- The KONI Challenge Series, formerly the Grand-Am Cup series, a touring car racing series
- National Sports Committee of Indonesia (Komite Olahraga Nasional Indonesia), abbreviated KONI
- a synonym for Xalam, a stringed musical instrument
- Koni the Giant Boy, a Japanese cartoon that aired on TV Tokyo
- Tropical Storm Koni, 2003 severe Pacific tropical storm

== See also ==
- Kony (disambiguation)
- Connie (disambiguation)
- Conny, a name
- Konni (disambiguation)
