= Robert Conn =

Robert Conn may refer to:

- Rob Conn (born 1968), Canadian former National Hockey League player
- Robert H. Conn (1925–2020), United States Deputy Under Secretary and Assistant Secretary of the Navy
- Robert W. Conn (born 1942), president and chief executive officer of the Kavli Foundation
- Robert Conn, expert in plasma physics and semiconductors at Jacobs School of Engineering
- Robert Conn, musician with The Pagans

== See also ==
- Robert Conny (1646–1713), English physician
