= Alexander Bonde =

German politician (born 1975)

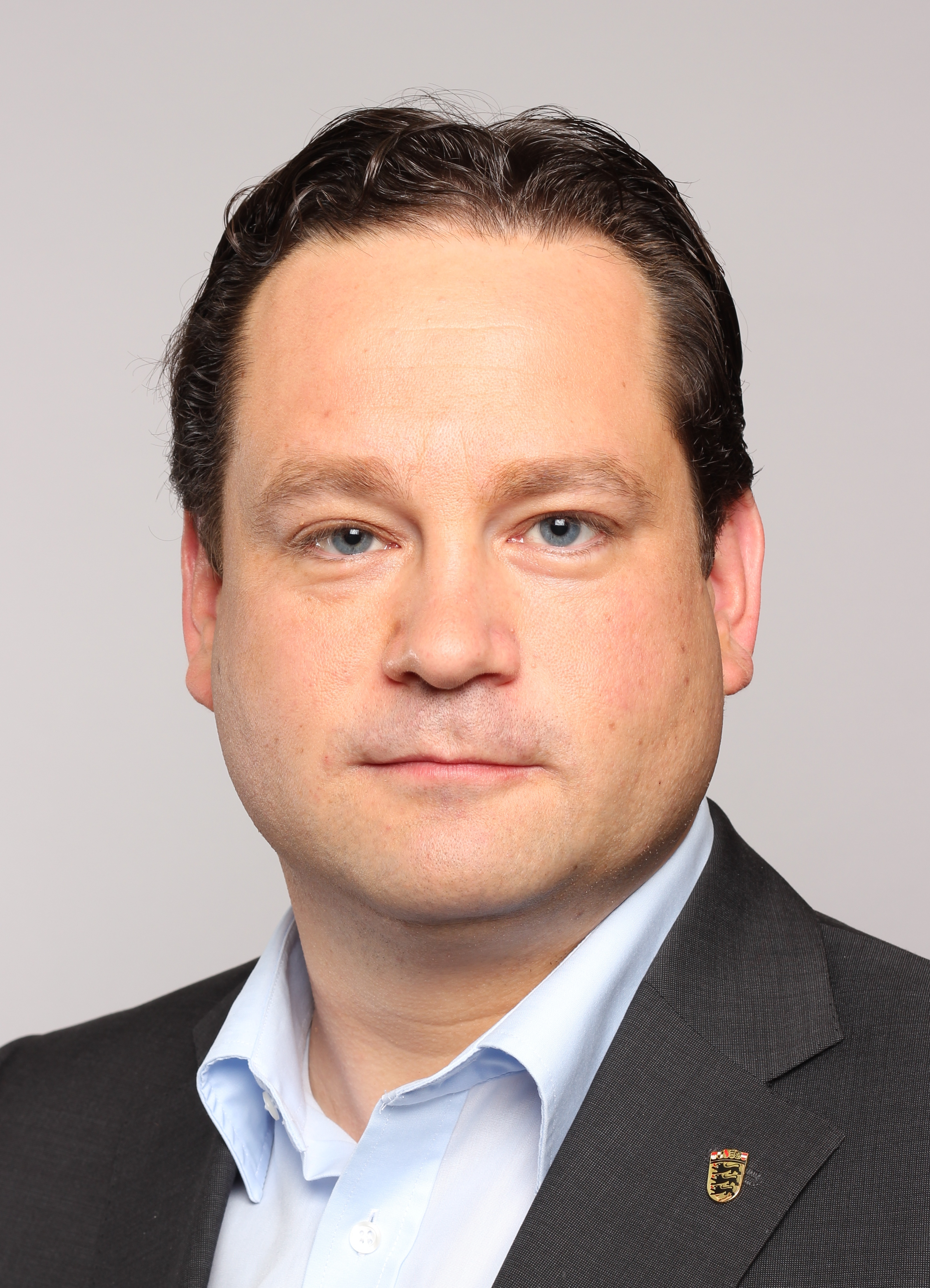
Bonde in 2013

Alexander Bonde (born 12 January 1975 in Freiburg im Breisgau) is a German politician of Alliance 90/The Greens who has been serving as the secretary-general of the German Federal Environment Foundation (DBU) since 2018.

== Early life and education ==
In 1992 and 1993 Bonde was an exchange student at Kahuku High School (Oahu, Hawaii, USA). One of his classmates was Jack Johnson.

== Political career ==
=== Member of the Bundestag, 2002–2011 ===
From 2002 to 2011, Bonde was a member of the Bundestag. There he represented his constituency 283 Emmendingen-Lahr, a rural area in the Black Forest that covers 41 municipalities in the state of Baden-Württemberg. Bonde was first elected in 2002 and was reelected in 2005 and 2009.

Bonde served on the Defense Committee and on the Budget Committee. He was also a member of the Financial Markets Committee that supervises the German banking rescue package. On the Budget Committee, Bonde served as “rapporteur-general” for agriculture (the equivalent to chairing a small subcommittee) as “rapporteur” (equivalent to being a member of a small subcommittee) for defence, economy and labor.

From 2008 to 2010, Bonde was a member of the parliamentary body providing oversight of the Special Financial Market Stabilization Funds (SoFFin).

In addition to his committee assignments, Bonde served as vice-chairman of the German-American Parliamentary Group and of the Aviation & Space Caucus of the German Bundestag.

=== State Minister for Rural Areas and Consumer Rights, 2011–2016 ===
In 2011, Bonde was appointed State Minister for Rural Areas, Agriculture and Consumer Rights in the state government of Baden-Württemberg under Minister-President Winfried Kretschmann.

In the negotiations to form a coalition government with the Christian Democratic Union (CDU) under the leadership of Kretschmann following the 2016 state elections, Bonde led his party’s delegation in the working group on rural affairs and consumer protection. On 12 May 2016 Peter Hauk (CDU) became his successor.

== Later career ==
In December 2017, the board of trustees of the German Federal Environment Foundation (DBU) – at the time chaired by Rita Schwarzelühr-Sutter – appointed Bonde as the organization's secretary general.

In the negotiations to form another coalition government under Kretschmann's leadership following the 2021 state elections, Bonde was a member of the working group on climate, environmental policy and energy, co-chaired by Sandra Detzer and Andreas Jung.

== Personal life ==
Bonde is married to Conny Mayer-Bonde.

== Other activities ==
- Vodafone Germany, Member of the Advisory Board on Sustainability (since 2020)
