= List of storms named Connie =

The name Connie has been used for nine tropical cyclones worldwide: one in the Atlantic Ocean, three in the Eastern Pacific Ocean, one in the Western Pacific Ocean, two in the South-West Indian Ocean, and two in the Australian region.

In the Atlantic:

- Hurricane Connie (1955), struck the U.S. coast from North Carolina to New England

The name, Connie was retired from the Atlantic basin due to the storm's destructive impact and high death toll.

In the Eastern Pacific:

- Hurricane Connie (1966), no reported damage or deaths
- Tropical Storm Connie (1970), stalled 118 mi (190 km) from Clarion Island; did not make landfall
- Hurricane Connie (1974), never made landfall

In the Western Pacific:

- Typhoon Connie (1945), did not make landfall

In the South-West Indian:

- Tropical Storm Connie (1964)
- Cyclone Connie (2000), affected the islands of Mauritius and Réunion

In the Australian region:

- Cyclone Connie (1966)
- Cyclone Connie (1987), near Western Australia
