= 1986–87 South Pacific cyclone season =

Tropical cyclone season

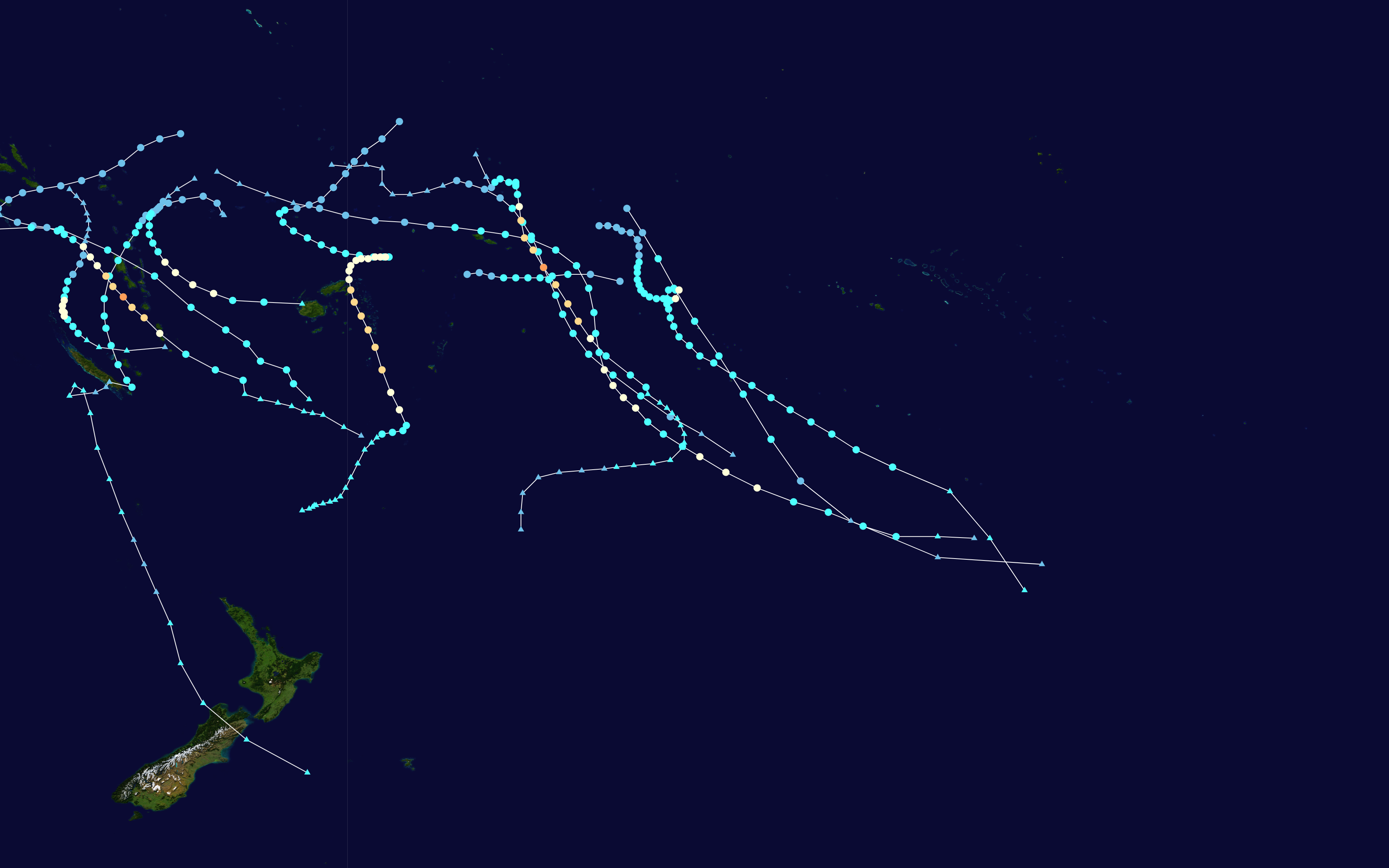
- Season summary map

Seasonal boundaries
- First system formed: November 20, 1986
- Last system dissipated: May 22, 1987

Strongest storm
- Name: Uma
  - Maximum winds: 165 km/h (105 mph) (10-minute sustained)
  - Lowest pressure: 940 hPa (mbar)

Seasonal statistics
- Total depressions: 13
- Tropical cyclones: 12
- Severe tropical cyclones: 6
- Total fatalities: 52
- Total damage: > $269 million (1986 USD)

Related articles
- 1986–87 South-West Indian Ocean cyclone season; 1986–87 Australian region cyclone season

The 1986–87 South Pacific cyclone season was an above average tropical cyclone season. A total of 12 tropical cyclones developed during the season, 6 of which became severe tropical cyclones.

== Seasonal summary ==
During the season twelve tropical cyclones were recorded within the South Pacific basin, which was considered above average when compared to an 18-year average of 10 systems.

== Systems ==
=== Tropical Cyclone Osea ===
- Category 2 tropical cyclone (Australian scale)
- Category 1 tropical cyclone (SSHWS)
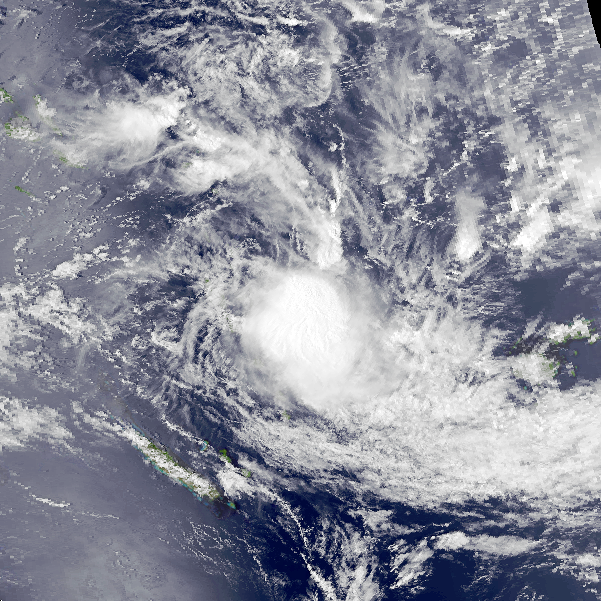
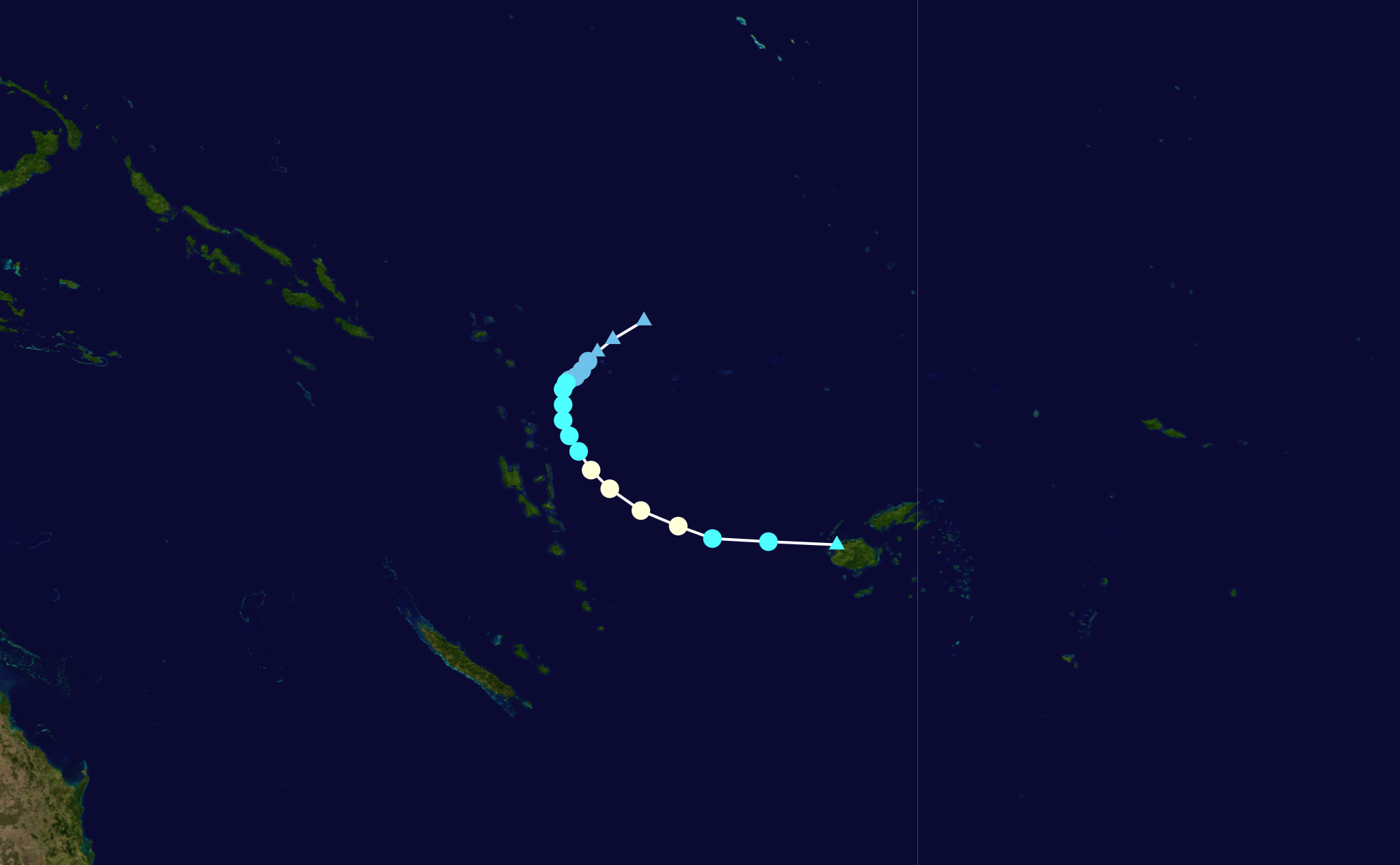
- Duration: November 20 – November 25
- Peak intensity: 100 km/h (65 mph) (10-min); 980 hPa (mbar)

Tropical Cyclone Osea formed about 565 km (350 mi) to the north-northeast of Port Vila on 21 November. It moved on a southerly track parallel to Vanuatu and spent most of its time over the sea. No significant damage was reported.

=== Tropical Cyclone Patsy ===
- Category 2 tropical cyclone (Australian scale)
- Tropical storm (SSHWS)
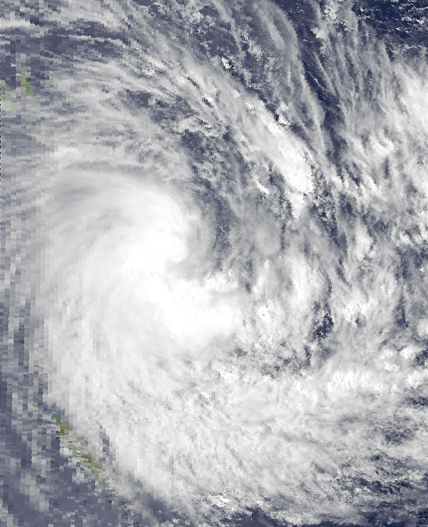
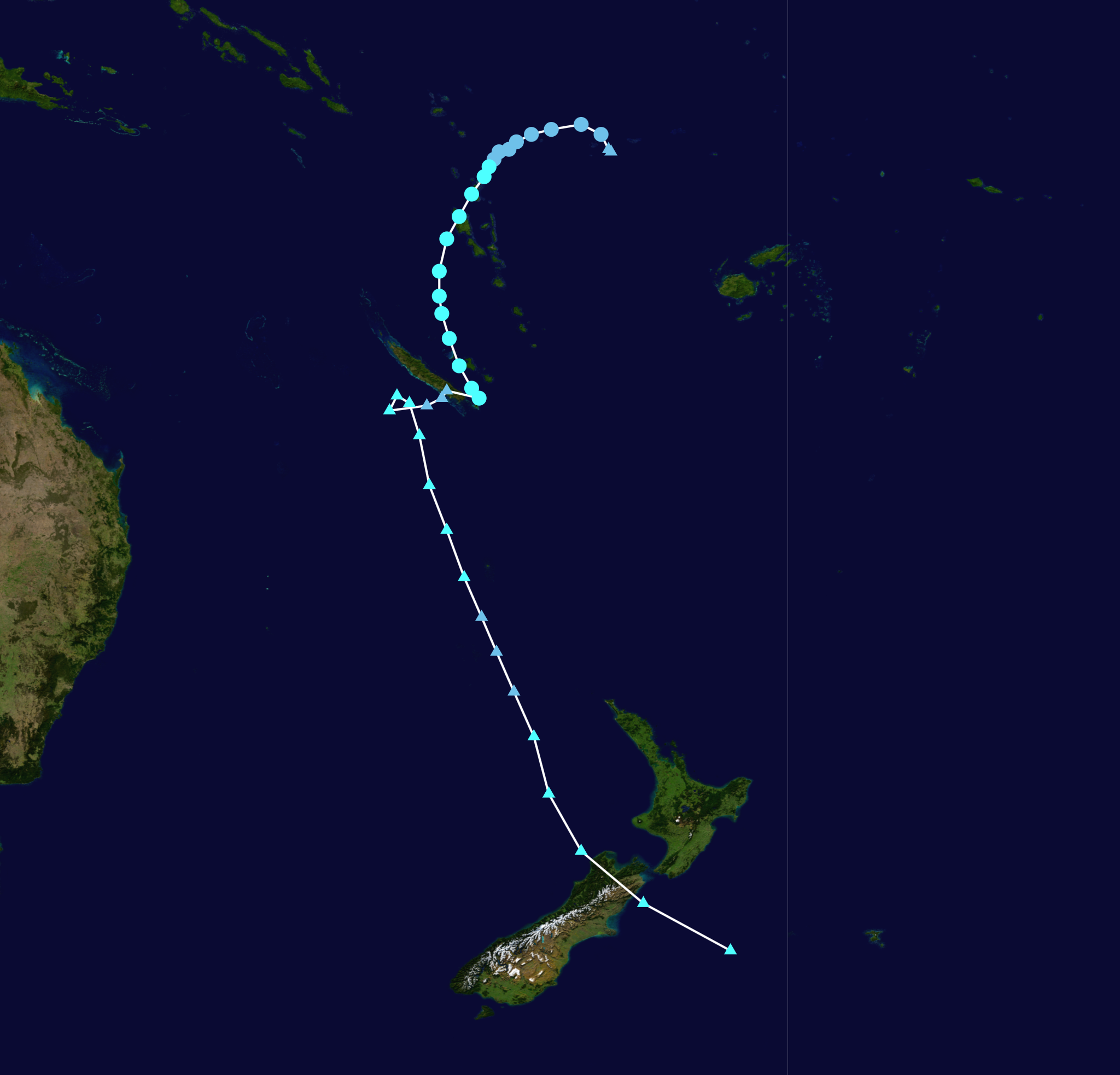
- Duration: December 12 – December 22
- Peak intensity: 100 km/h (65 mph) (10-min); 975 hPa (mbar)

On December 12, TCWC Nadi started to monitor a tropical depression that had developed about 1,000 km (620 mi) to the north-northwest of Suva, Fiji.

The system affected Northern Vanuatu but caused little or no damage to the island nation.

=== Severe Tropical Cyclone Raja ===
- Category 3 severe tropical cyclone (Australian scale)
- Category 2 tropical cyclone (SSHWS)
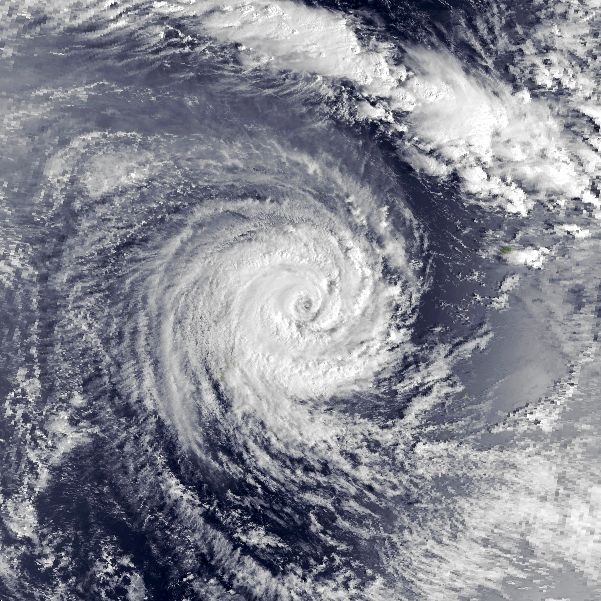
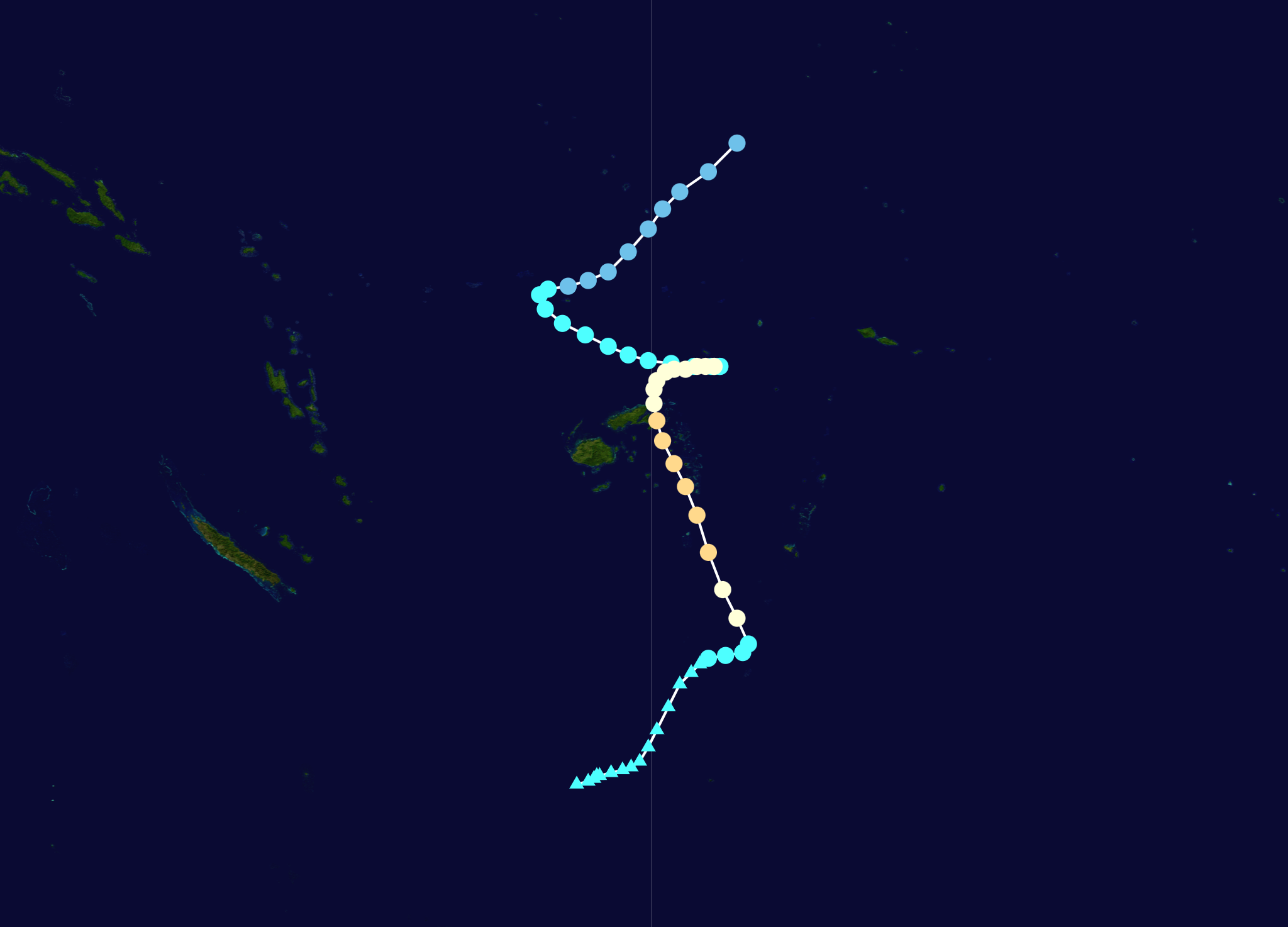
- Duration: December 21 – January 5
- Peak intensity: 150 km/h (90 mph) (10-min); 955 hPa (mbar)

Cyclone Raja existed from December 21, 1986, to January 5, 1987.

=== Severe Tropical Cyclone Sally ===
- Category 3 severe tropical cyclone (Australian scale)
- Category 1 tropical cyclone (SSHWS)
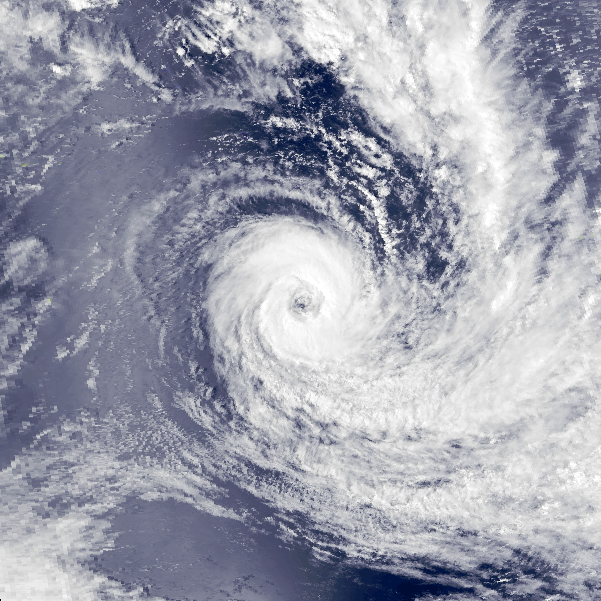
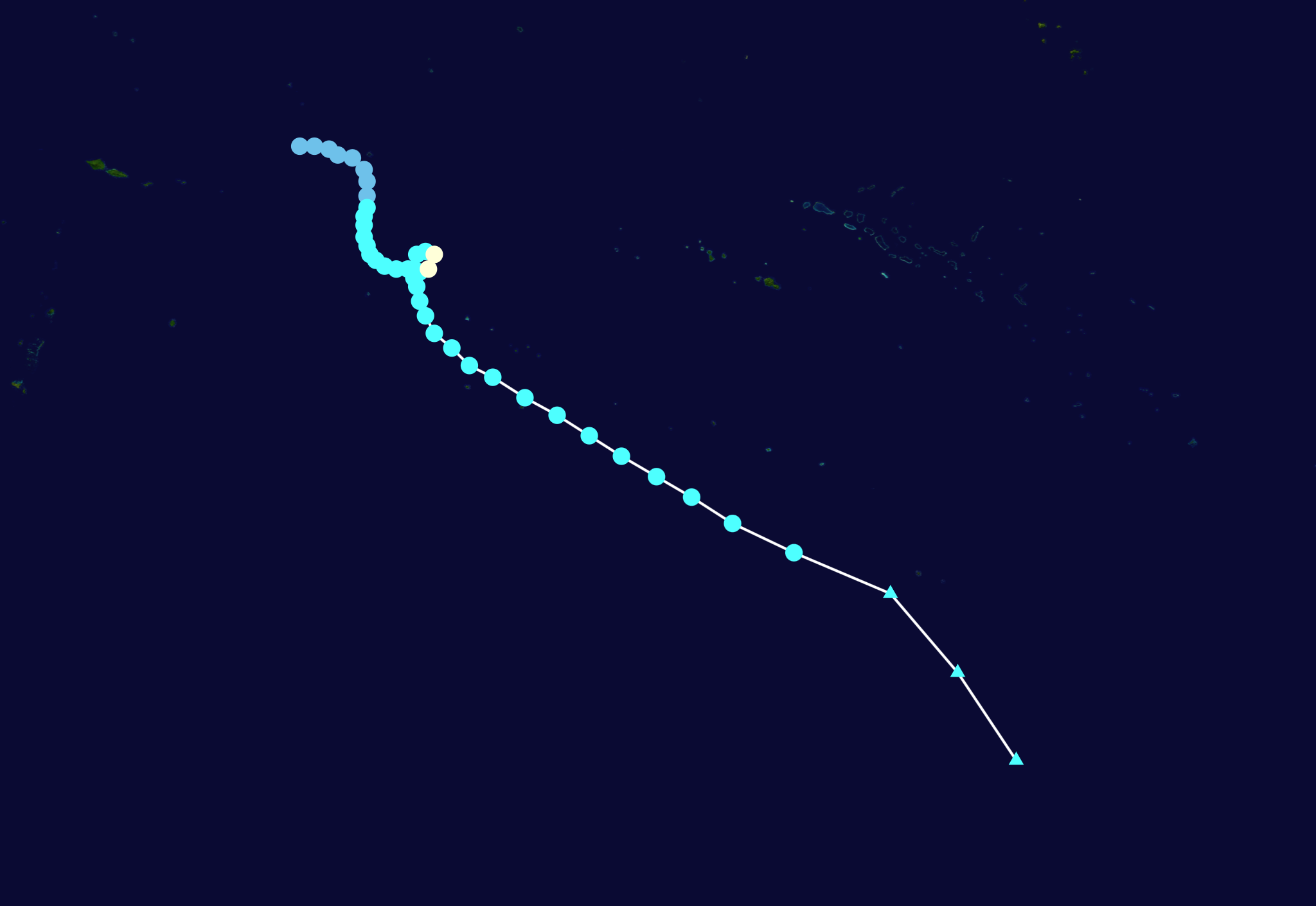
- Duration: December 26 – January 6
- Peak intensity: 150 km/h (90 mph) (10-min); 955 hPa (mbar)

Cyclone Sally existed from December 26, 1986, to January 6, 1987. It caused A$35 million of damage in the Cook Islands, making a thousand people homeless on Rarotonga and severely damaging 80% of the buildings in Avarua.

=== Severe Tropical Cyclone Tusi ===
- Category 3 severe tropical cyclone (Australian scale)
- Category 3 tropical cyclone (SSHWS)
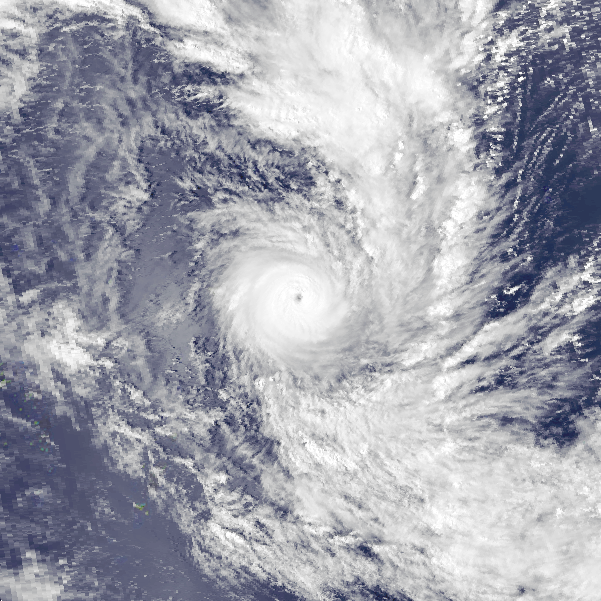
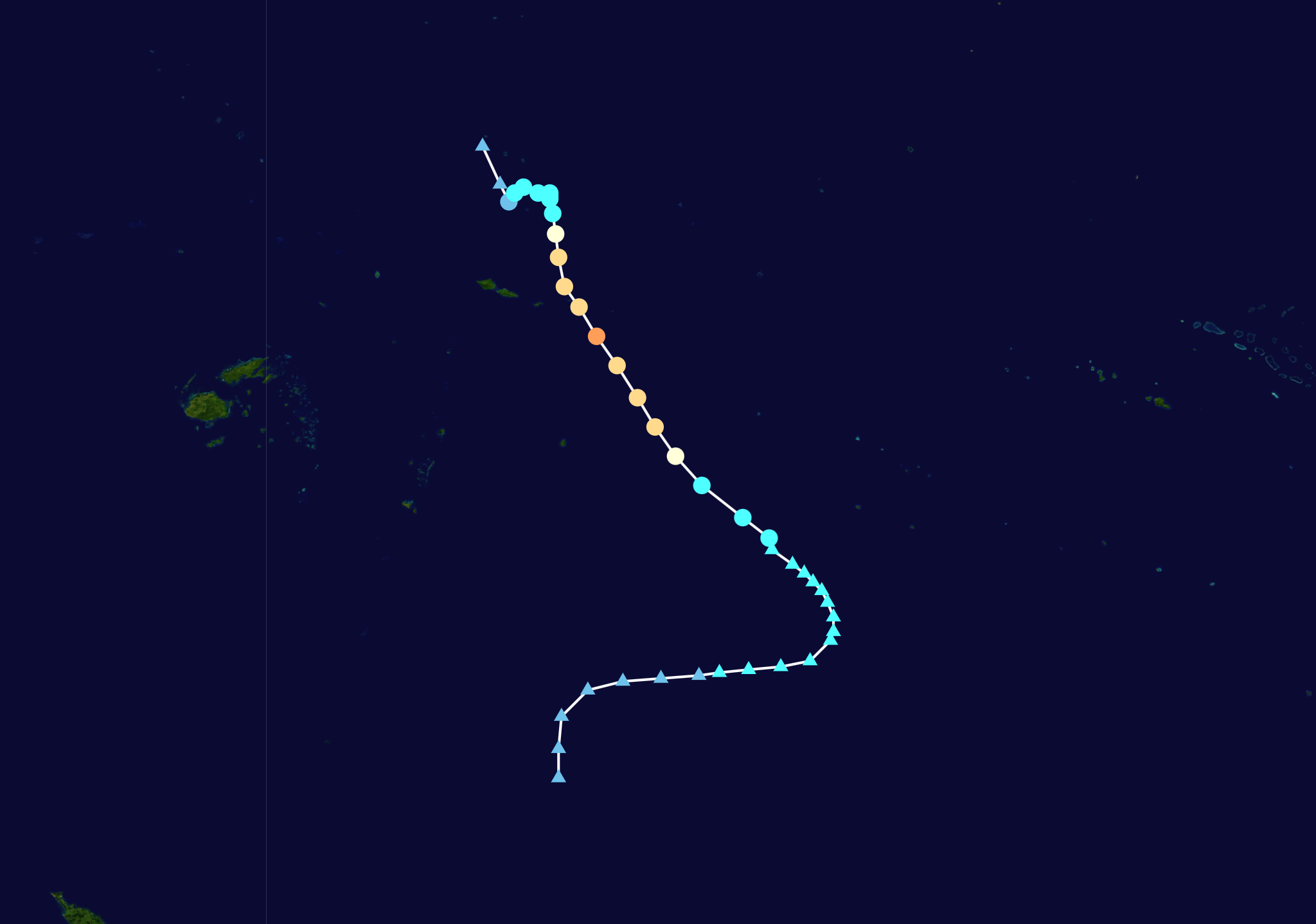
- Duration: January 13 – January 25
- Peak intensity: 150 km/h (90 mph) (10-min); 955 hPa (mbar)

On January 13, TCWC Nadi started to monitor a tropical depression that had developed, within a trough of low pressure near the island nation of Tuvalu. Over the next few days the system gradually developed further before it was named Tusi during January 16, after it had become equivalent to a modern-day category 1 tropical cyclone on the Australian tropical cyclone intensity scale. After being named the system gradually intensified as it moved southeastwards along the trough, between the islands of Fakaofo and Swains during January 17. Tusi's eye subsequently passed near or over American Samoa's Manu'a Islands early the next day, as the system peaked in intensity with 10-minute sustained wind speeds of 150 km/h (95 mph). The system subsequently posed a threat to the Southern Cook Islands, however this threat gradually diminished as Tusi moved southwards and approached 25S on January 20.

=== Severe Tropical Cyclone Uma ===
- Category 4 severe tropical cyclone (Australian scale)
- Category 3 tropical cyclone (SSHWS)
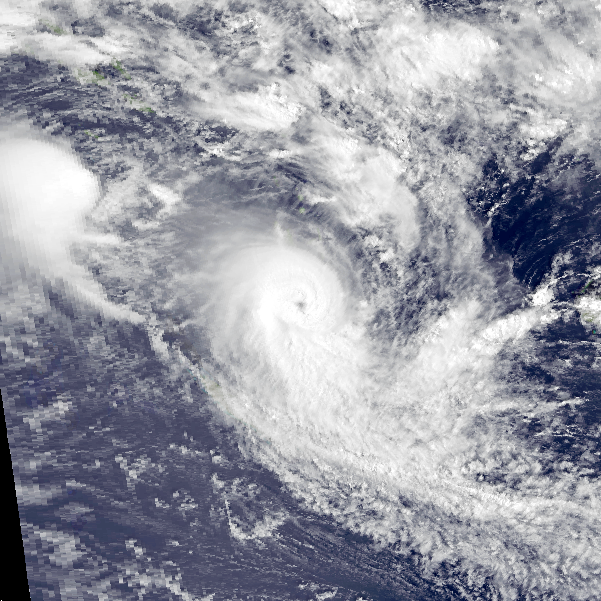
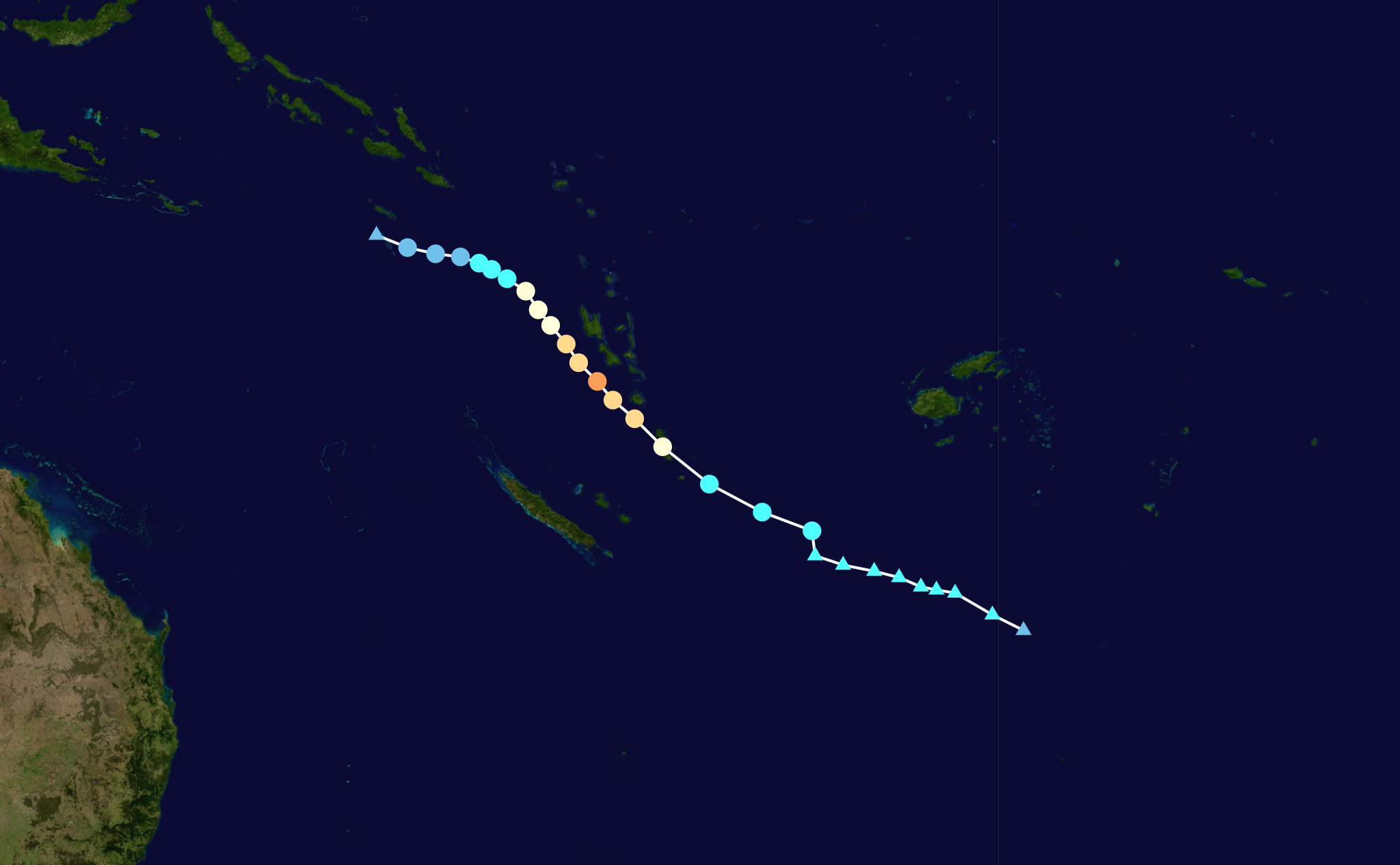
- Duration: February 4 – February 10
- Peak intensity: 165 km/h (105 mph) (10-min); 940 hPa (mbar)

Cyclone Uma caused severe damages in Vanuatu. The storm formed on February 4 and dissipated on February 10.

=== Tropical Cyclone Veli ===
- Category 1 tropical cyclone (Australian scale)
- Tropical storm (SSHWS)
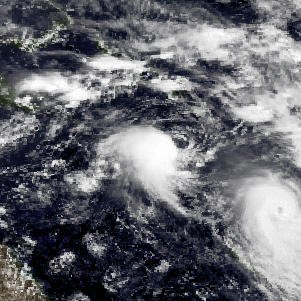
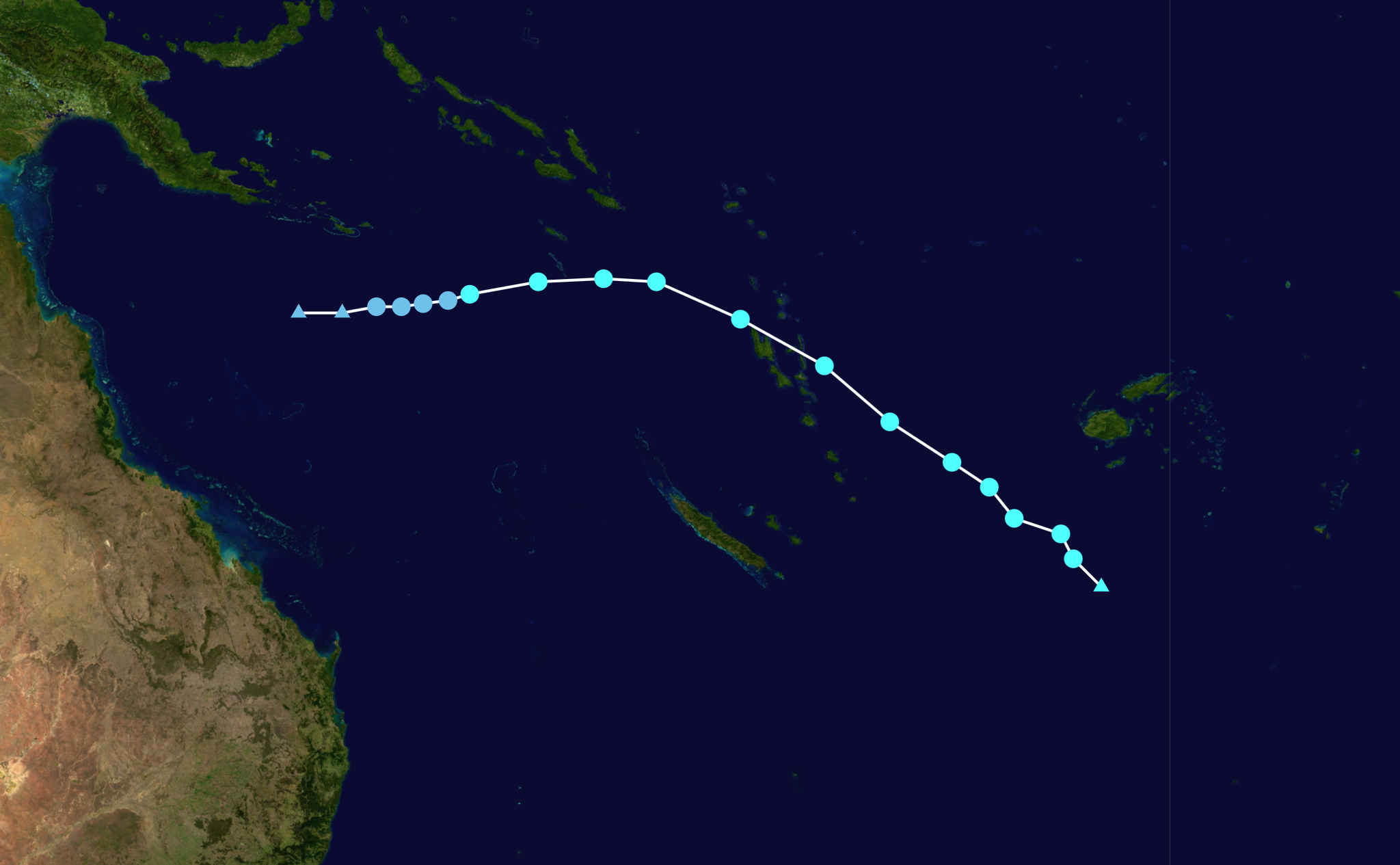
- Duration: February 7 – February 9
- Peak intensity: 85 km/h (50 mph) (10-min); 987 hPa (mbar)

The precursor tropical low to Cyclone Veli formed within the Australian region on February 5, about 725 km (450 mi) to the south-east of Port Moresby in Papua New Guinea. During the next day the low moved eastwards and gradually developed further, before it became equivalent to a category 1 tropical cyclone on the Australian scale, as it reached its 10-minute sustained wind speeds of 85 km/h (50 mph). As the system continued to move eastwards it crossed 160°E and moved into the South Pacific basin during February 7, before the FMS named it Veli later that day on the basis of satellite derived evidence. During that day the system continued to move eastwards, before as it passed near to Espiritu Santo, Veli started to move steadily towards the south-east. Early the next day the JTWC initiated advisories and started to monitor Veli as Tropical Cyclone 16P, with peak 1-minute sustained windspeeds of 45 km/h (30 mph). During that day strong upper level north-westerlies caused vertical windshear to increase over Cyclones Veli and Uma and thus weakened them. During February 9, Cyclone Veli absorbed Uma and formed a complex low, which moved slowly south-eastwards and became extratropical. Damage within Vanuatu was either minimal or went unreported, as the island nation was more concerned with the aftermath of Cyclone Uma.

=== Severe Tropical Cyclone Wini ===
- Category 3 severe tropical cyclone (Australian scale)
- Category 1 tropical cyclone (SSHWS)
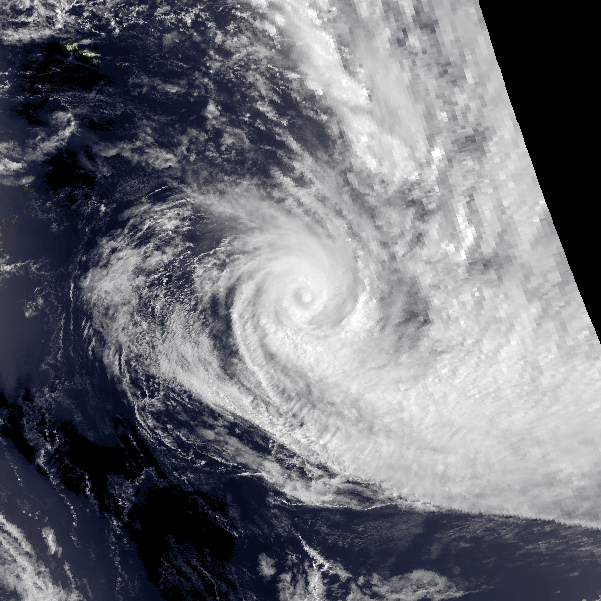
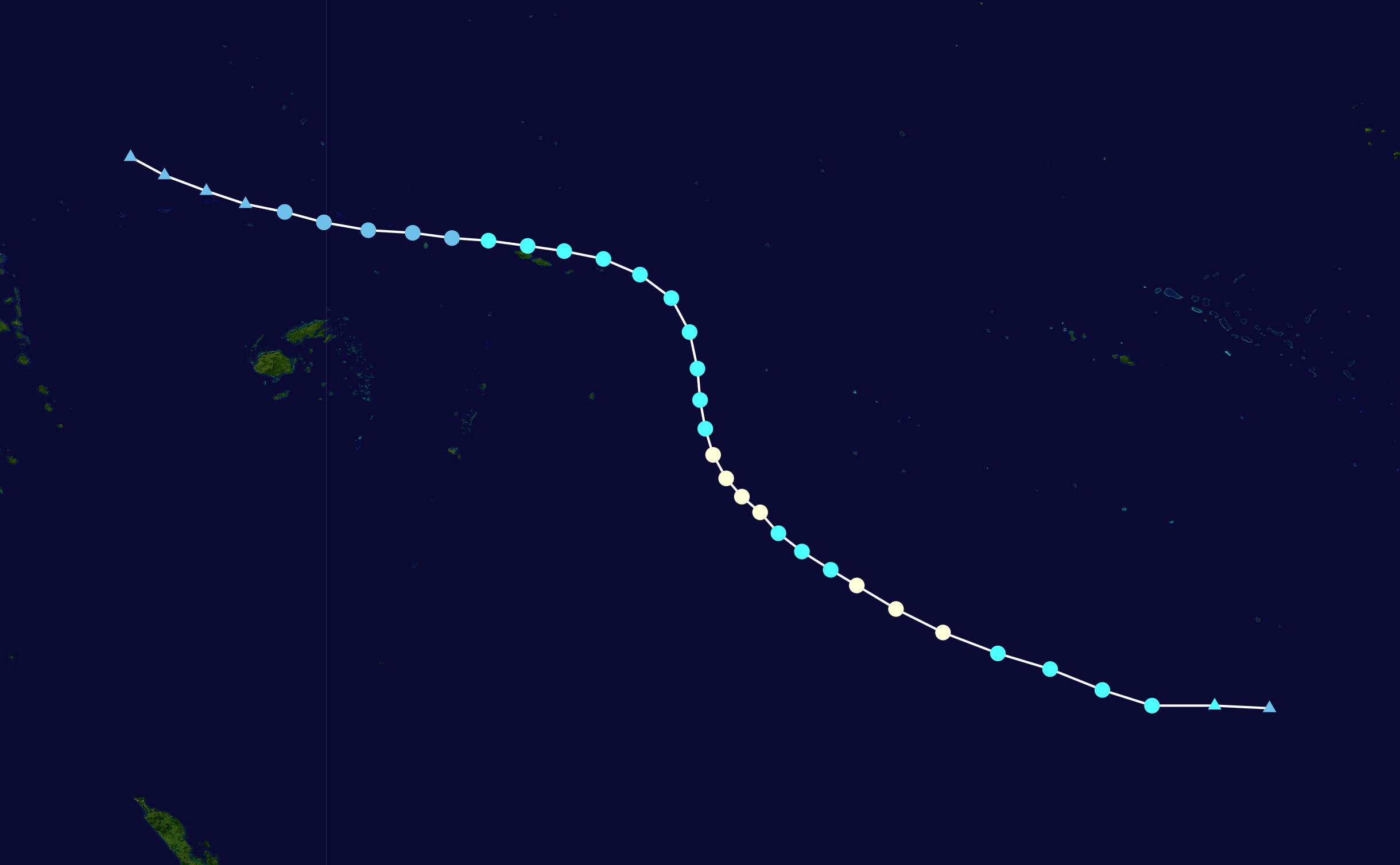
- Duration: February 27 – March 7
- Peak intensity: 130 km/h (80 mph) (10-min); 965 hPa (mbar)

Cyclone Wini existed from February 27 to March 7.

=== Tropical Cyclone Unnamed/19P ===
- Category 2 tropical cyclone (Australian scale)
- Tropical storm (SSHWS)
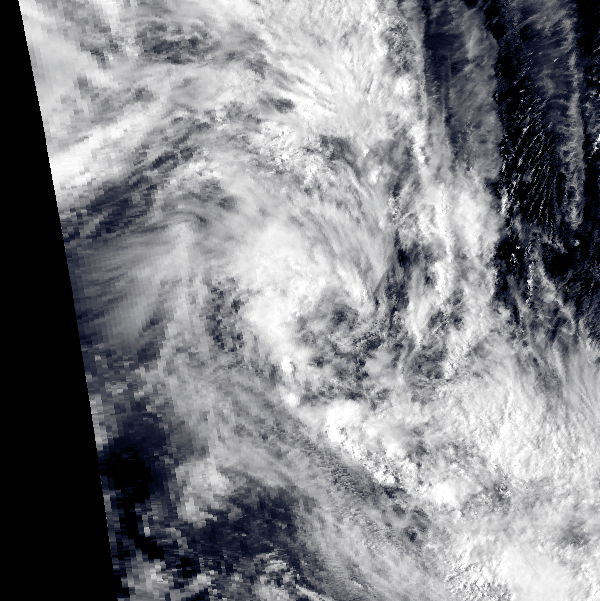
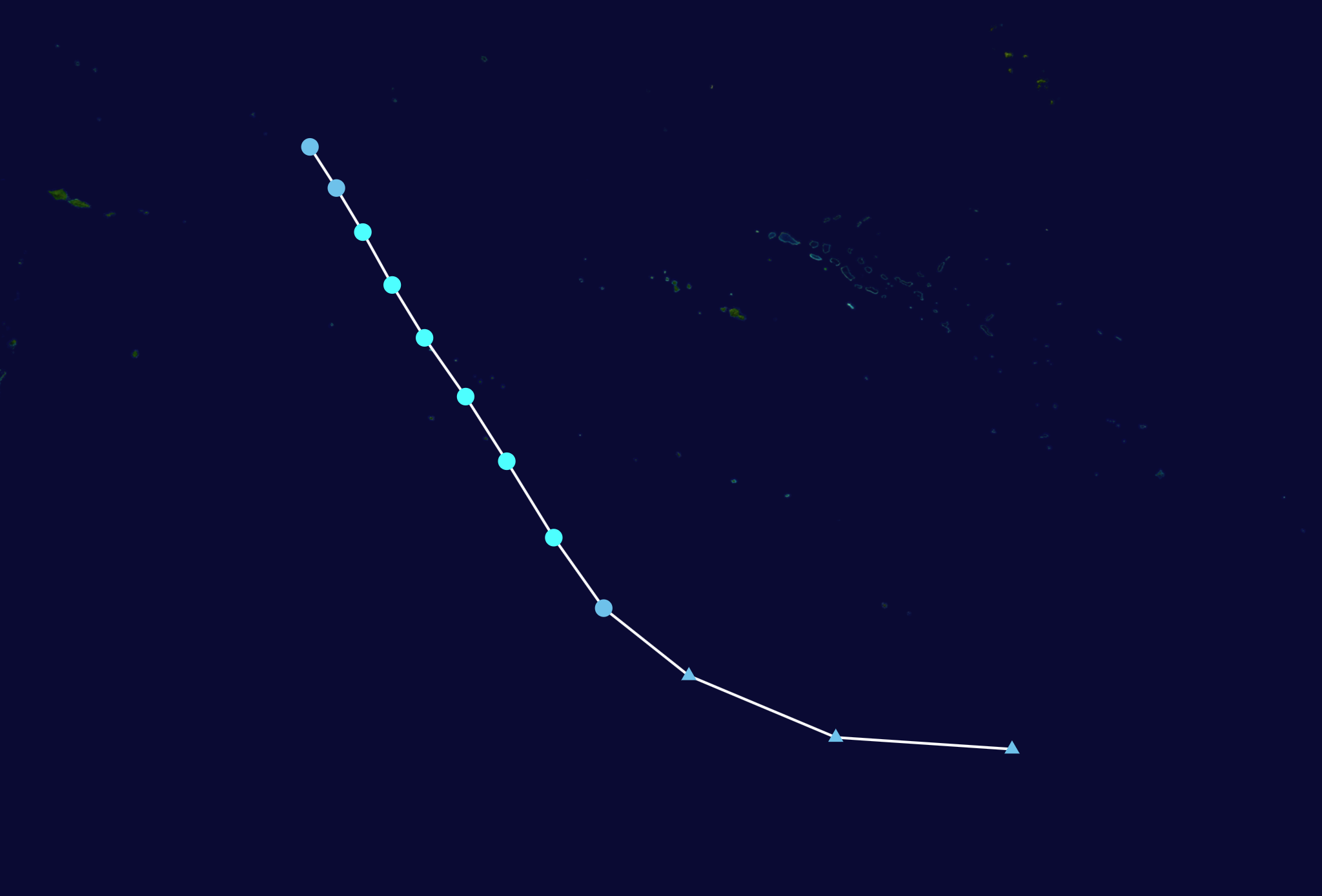
- Duration: February 28 – March 3
- Peak intensity: 95 km/h (60 mph) (10-min); 985 hPa (mbar)

=== Severe Tropical Cyclone Yali ===
- Category 3 severe tropical cyclone (Australian scale)
- Category 1 tropical cyclone (SSHWS)
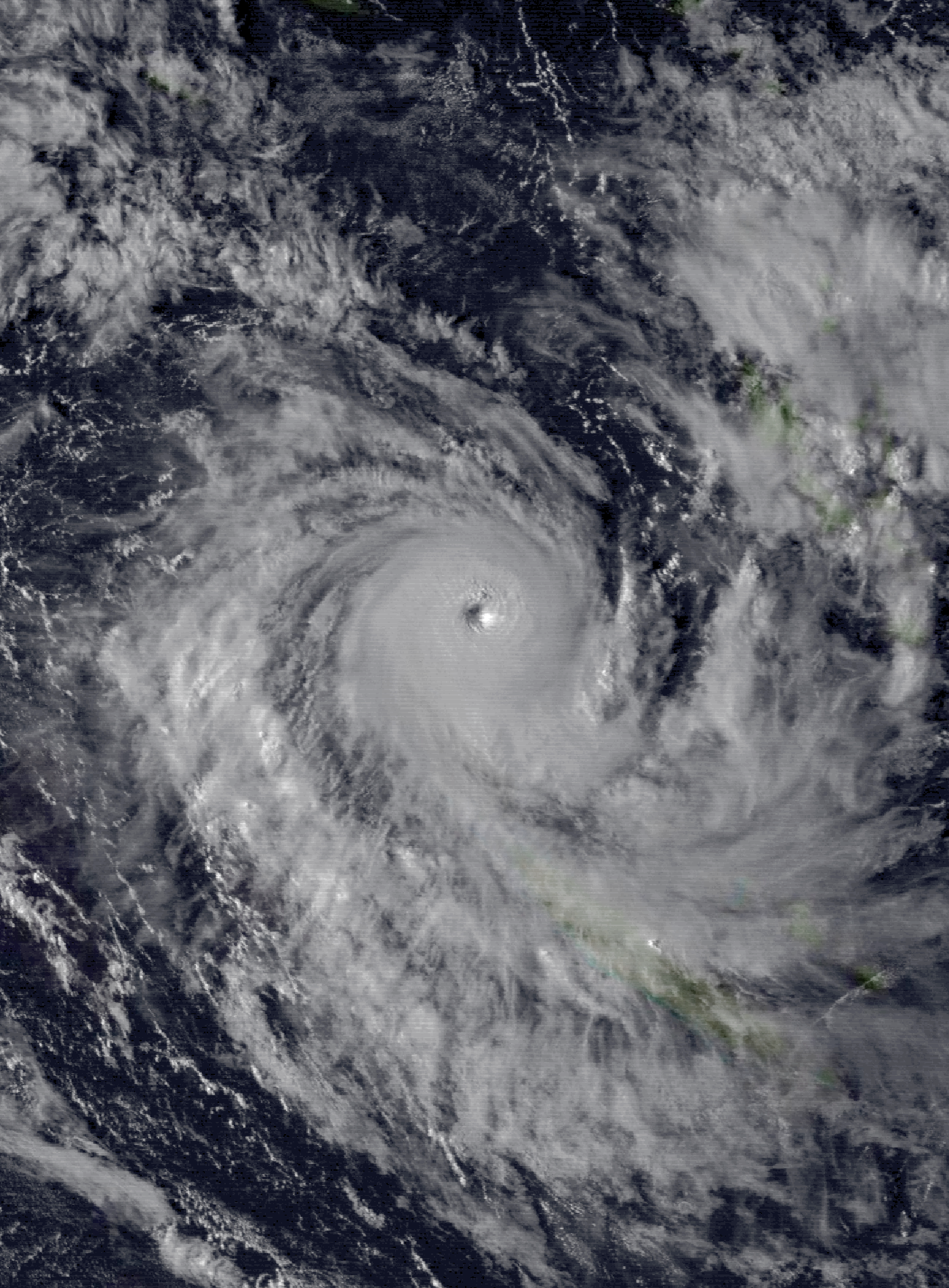
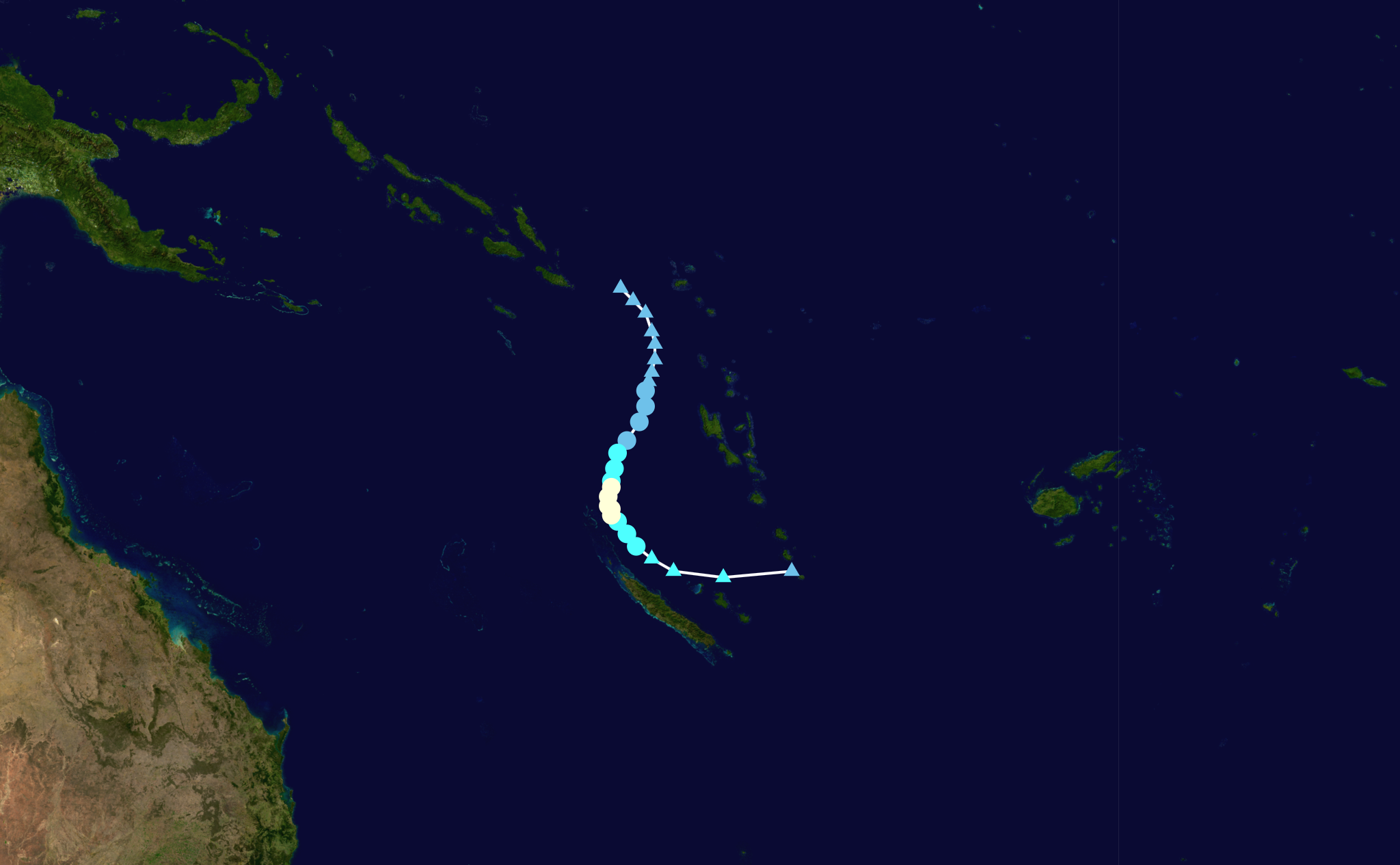
- Duration: March 5 – March 11
- Peak intensity: 120 km/h (75 mph) (10-min); 970 hPa (mbar)

A shallow tropical depression developed within a monsoon trough of low pressure on March 5, about 485 km (300 mi) to the southeast of Honiara, on the Solomon Island of Guadalcanal. Over the next 3 days the system remained as a shallow depression as it moved southwards, before it rapidly developed into a tropical cyclone underneath an upper-level ridge of high pressure. During March 8, the JTWC classified the system as Tropical Cyclone 22P and initiated advisories on the system, while it was named Yali by the FMS after it had developed into a Category 1 tropical cyclone on the Australian scale. During the next day Yali continued to intensify before as the ridge of high pressure moved northwards, before the system peaked with 1 and 10-minute sustained windspeeds of 120 km/h (75 mph). This made it equivalent to a category 3 severe tropical cyclone on the Australian scale and a category 1 hurricane on the SSHWS. Yali rapidly weakened and dissipated over water during March 11. Despite being within the vicinity of both Vanuatu and New Caledonia, the system did not pass close enough to affect or cause any damage to any inhabited islands.

=== Tropical Cyclone Zuman ===
- Category 2 tropical cyclone (Australian scale)
- Tropical storm (SSHWS)
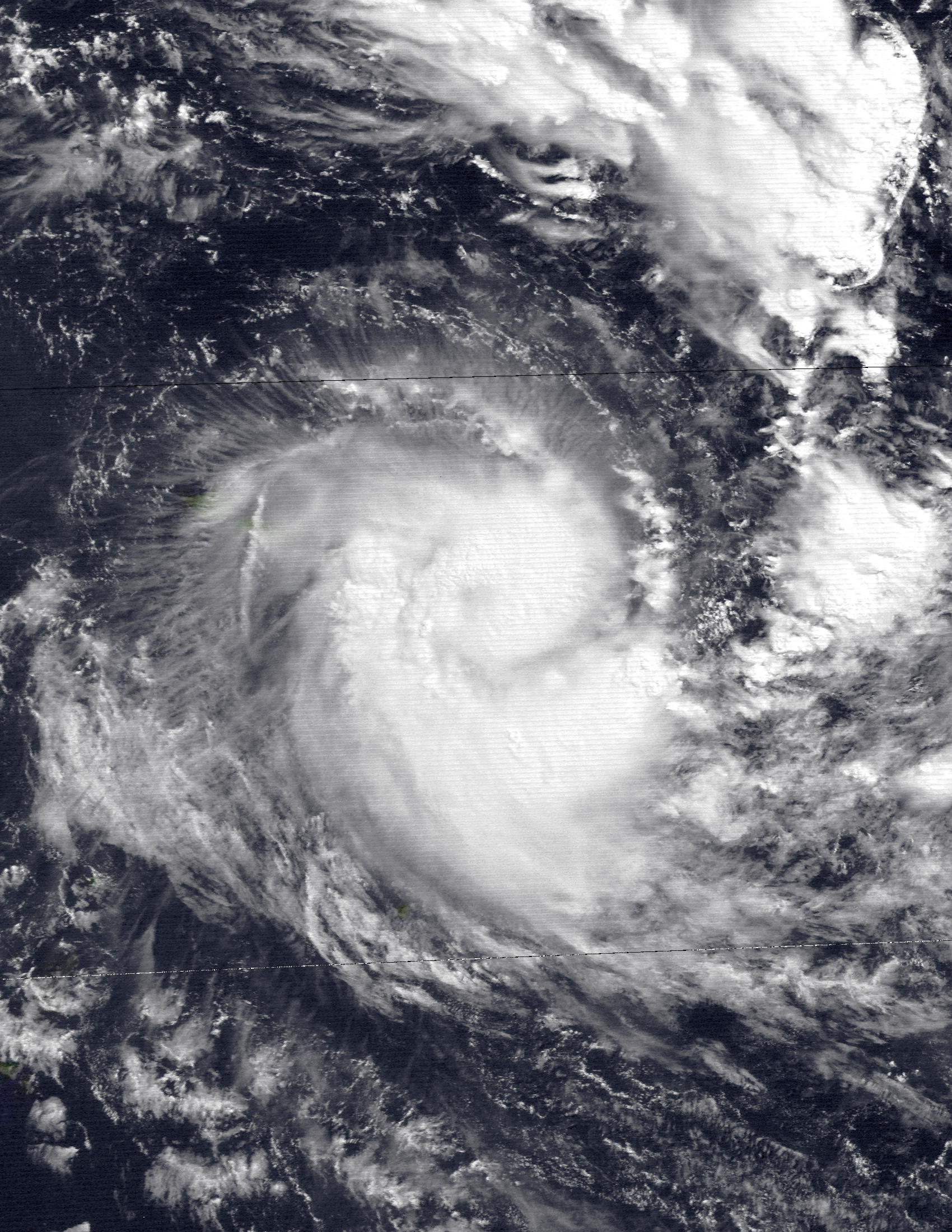
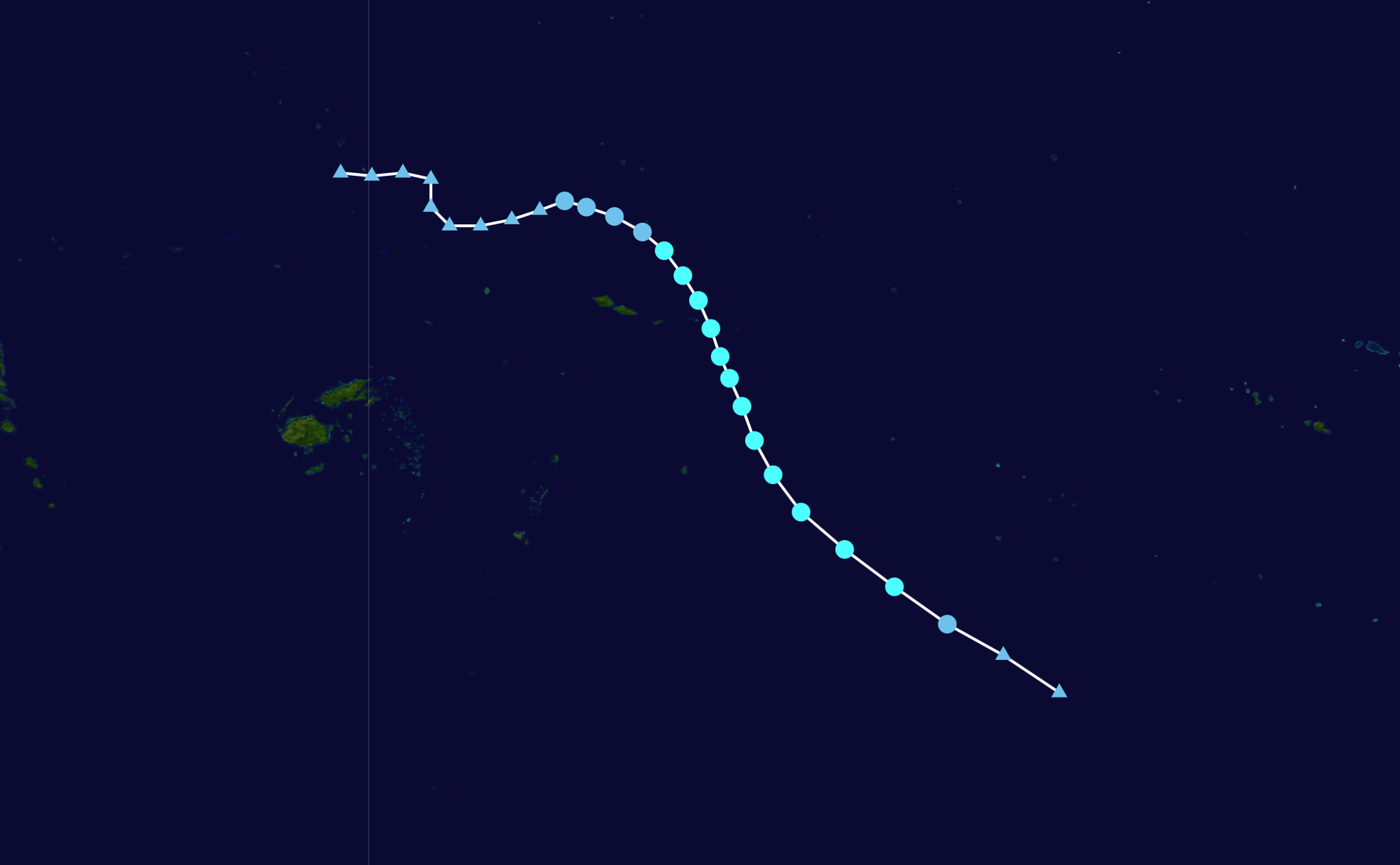
- Duration: April 19 – April 26
- Peak intensity: 110 km/h (70 mph) (10-min); 975 hPa (mbar)

Cyclone Zuman existed from April 19 to April 26.

=== Tropical Cyclone Blanch ===
- Category 1 tropical cyclone (Australian scale)
- Tropical depression (SSHWS)
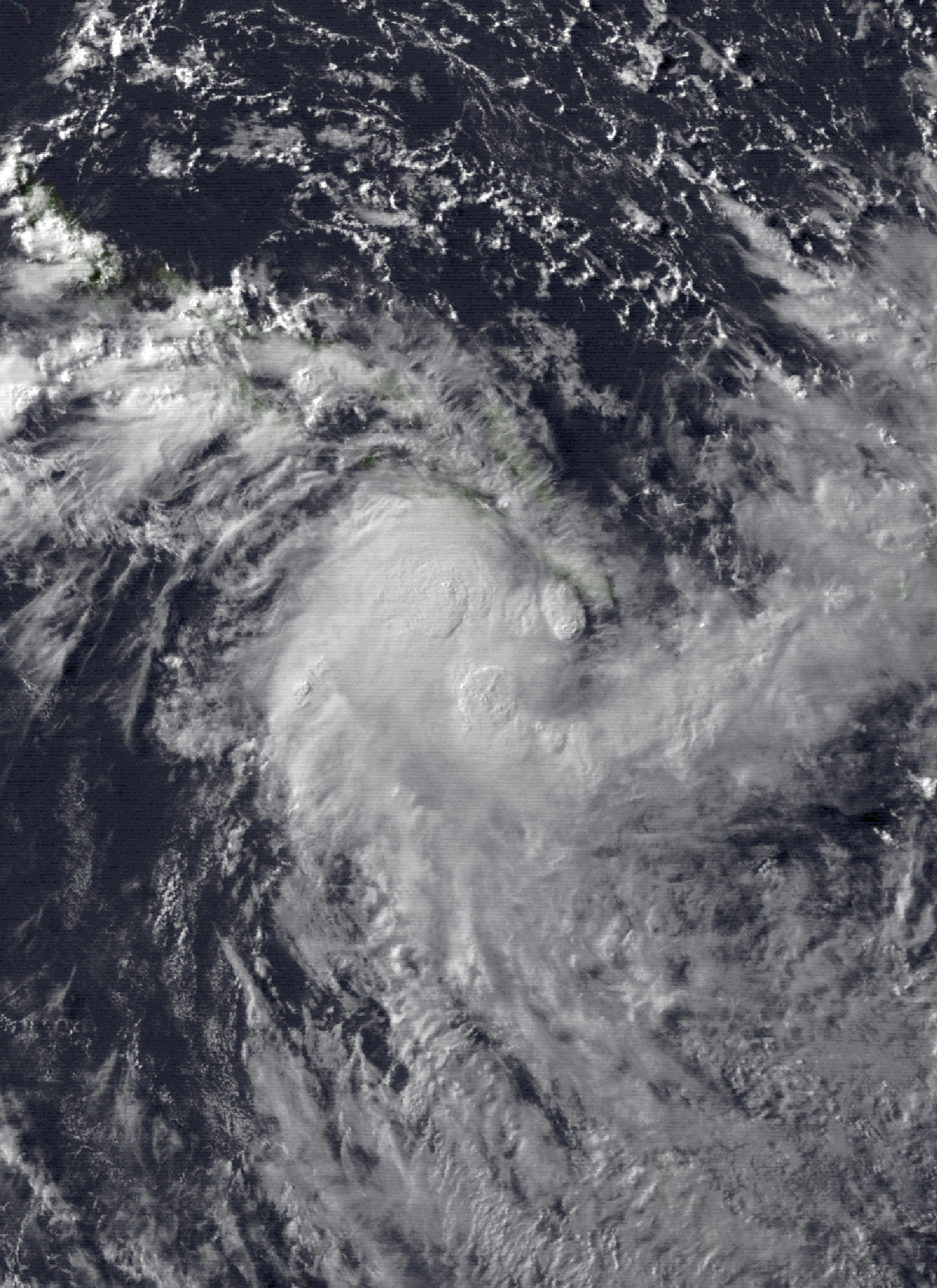
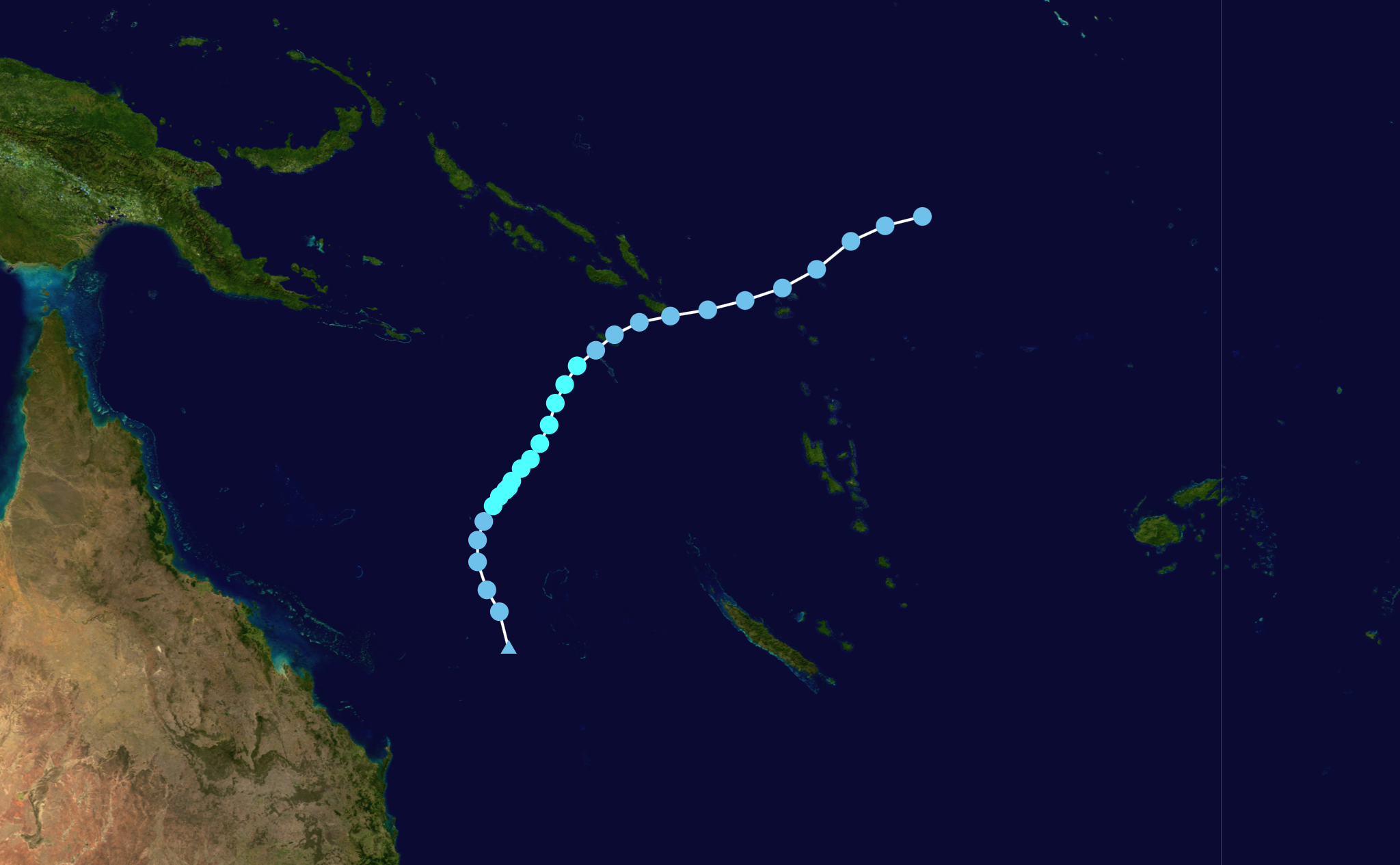
- Duration: May 20 – May 22 (Exited basin)
- Peak intensity: 75 km/h (45 mph) (10-min); 990 hPa (mbar)

On May 20, TCWC Nadi started to monitor a tropical depression that had developed about 1,440 km (895 mi) to the northeast of Port Vila, Vanuatu.

=== Other system ===
In addition to 12 named cyclones, one other system developed during the season. Cyclone 13P existed from February 2 to February 5.

== Seasonal effects ==
Name	Dates	Peak intensity			Areas affected	Damage (USD)	Deaths	Ref(s).
Name	Dates	Category	Wind speed	Pressure	Areas affected	Damage (USD)	Deaths	Ref(s).
Osea	November 20 – 25	Category 2 tropical cyclone	100 km/h (65 mph)	980 hPa (28.94 inHg)	None	None	None	
Patsy	December 12 – 22	Category 2 tropical cyclone	110 km/h (70 mph)	975 hPa (28.79 inHg)	Vanuatu			
Raja	December 21 – January 5	Category 3 severe tropical cyclone	150 km/h (90 mph)	955 hPa (28.20 inHg)	Tuvalu, Wallis and Futuna, Fiji	$14 million	2	
Sally	December 26 – January 5	Category 3 severe tropical cyclone	150 km/h (90 mph)	955 hPa (28.20 inHg)	Cook Islands, French Polynesia	$25 million		
Tusi	January 13–21	Category 3 severe tropical cyclone	150 km/h (90 mph)	955 hPa (28.20 inHg)	Tokelau, Samoan Islands, Cook Islands	$80 million	None	
13P	February 2–5	Tropical Depression	Not specified	Not specified				
Uma	February 4–8	Category 4 severe tropical cyclone	165 km/h (105 mph)	940 hPa (27.76 inHg)	Vanuatu	$150 million	50	
Veli	February 7–9	Category 1 tropical cyclone	85 km/h (50 mph)	987 hPa (29.15 inHg)	Vanuatu	Minimal	None	
19P	February 28 – March 3	Category 2 tropical cyclone	95 km/h (60 mph)	985 hPa (29.09 inHg)				
Wini	February 27 – March 7	Category 3 severe tropical cyclone	130 km/h (80 mph)	965 hPa (28.50 inHg)	Western Samoa, American Samoa	Extensive	None	
Yali	March 5–11	Category 3 severe tropical cyclone	120 km/h (75 mph)	970 hPa (28.64 inHg)	Solomon Islands, Vanuatu, New Caledonia	None	None	
Zuman	April 19–26	Category 2 tropical cyclone	100 km/h (65 mph)	975 hPa (28.79 inHg)	Western Samoa, American Samoa			
Blanch(e)	May 20–22	Category 1 tropical cyclone	75 km/h (45 mph)	990 hPa (29.23 inHg)	Solomon Islands			
Season aggregates
13 systems	November 20 – May 22		165 km/h (105 mph)	940 hPa (27.76 inHg)		>$269 million	52	

== See also ==
- List of off-season South Pacific tropical cyclones
- Atlantic hurricane seasons: 1986, 1987
- Eastern Pacific hurricane seasons: 1986, 1987
- Western Pacific typhoon seasons: 1986, 1987
- North Indian Ocean cyclone seasons: 1986, 1987
