= Connie (disambiguation) =

Connie is a given name. It may also refer to:

- Hurricane Connie (disambiguation), various hurricanes and cyclones, a typhoon and a tropical storm
- Connie Glacier, Wyoming, United States
- Stenodus nelma, a species of whitefish whose common names include the connie
- Connie (TV series), a 1985 British drama series starring Stephanie Beacham
- Connie (comic strip), an American adventure comic strip (1927–1944)
- nickname of the Lockheed Constellation, a mid-20th century propeller-driven airliner
- nickname of the aircraft carrier USS Constellation (CV-64)
- nickname of the Vox Continental electronic organ

== See also ==
- Koni (disambiguation)
- Konni (disambiguation)
