= Conny Mayer-Bonde =

Member of the Bundestag
- In office 17 October 2002 – 18 October 2005

Personal details
- Born: 18 January 1972 (age 54) Forbach, Germany
- Party: Christian Democratic Union of Germany
- Spouse: Alexander Bonde

Conny Mayer-Bonde (born 18 January 1972) is a German university professor and politician from the Christian Democratic Union (CDU). She was a member of the German Bundestag from 17 October 2002 to 18 October 2005 during its 15th legislative period.

== Biography ==
After graduating from high school, Mayer-Bonde studied political science and business administration at Saarland University in Saarbrücken and at the University of Mannheim from 1991 to 1997. She received her doctorate from Mannheim in 2003. From 2007 to 2013, she taught as a professor of tourism management and service marketing at Karlshochschule International University in Karlsruhe. In 2013, she was appointed professor of tourism marketing in the business administration program at the Baden-Württemberg Cooperative State University in Ravensburg.

Mayer-Bonde was working as a city manager and managing director of Offenburg Marketing e. V. when she was elected to the Bundestag in the 2002 German federal election, securing ninth place on the CDU Baden-Württemberg state list. This remained her only term in parliament. In the subsequent 2005 German federal election, she lost as the direct candidate in constituency 282 (Freiburg) with 34.4 percent of the first-preference votes to Gernot Erler (SPD), who thus won the constituency for the third time in a row. Because the CDU received three overhang seats in Baden-Württemberg, the party's state list was not used, and Conny Mayer-Bonde was also ranked lower on it, at number 15, than in 2002.

From 2003 to 2009, Mayer-Bonde served as district chairwoman of the Women's Union of North Baden and from 2009 to 2012 as chairwoman of the CDU in the Freudenstadt district. From 2016 to 2021, she was a member of the National Regulatory Control Council (Nationaler Normenkontrollrat).

Conny Mayer-Bonde has been a member of the Tourism Advisory Board at the Federal Ministry for Economic Affairs and Energy since 2018. She is a member of the Board of Trustees of the children's aid organization Plan International Germany.

Since October 2023, Mayer-Bonde has been Dean of the Department of Business at the Center for Advanced Studies of the DHBW in Heilbronn.

Mayer-Bonde is married to the politician Alexander Bonde, who was Minister for Rural Affairs and Consumer Protection of the state of Baden-Württemberg from 2011 to 2016 for the Alliance 90/The Greens party. She is the mother of two sons and a daughter.
