= 1986–87 Australian region cyclone season =

Cyclone season in the Australian region

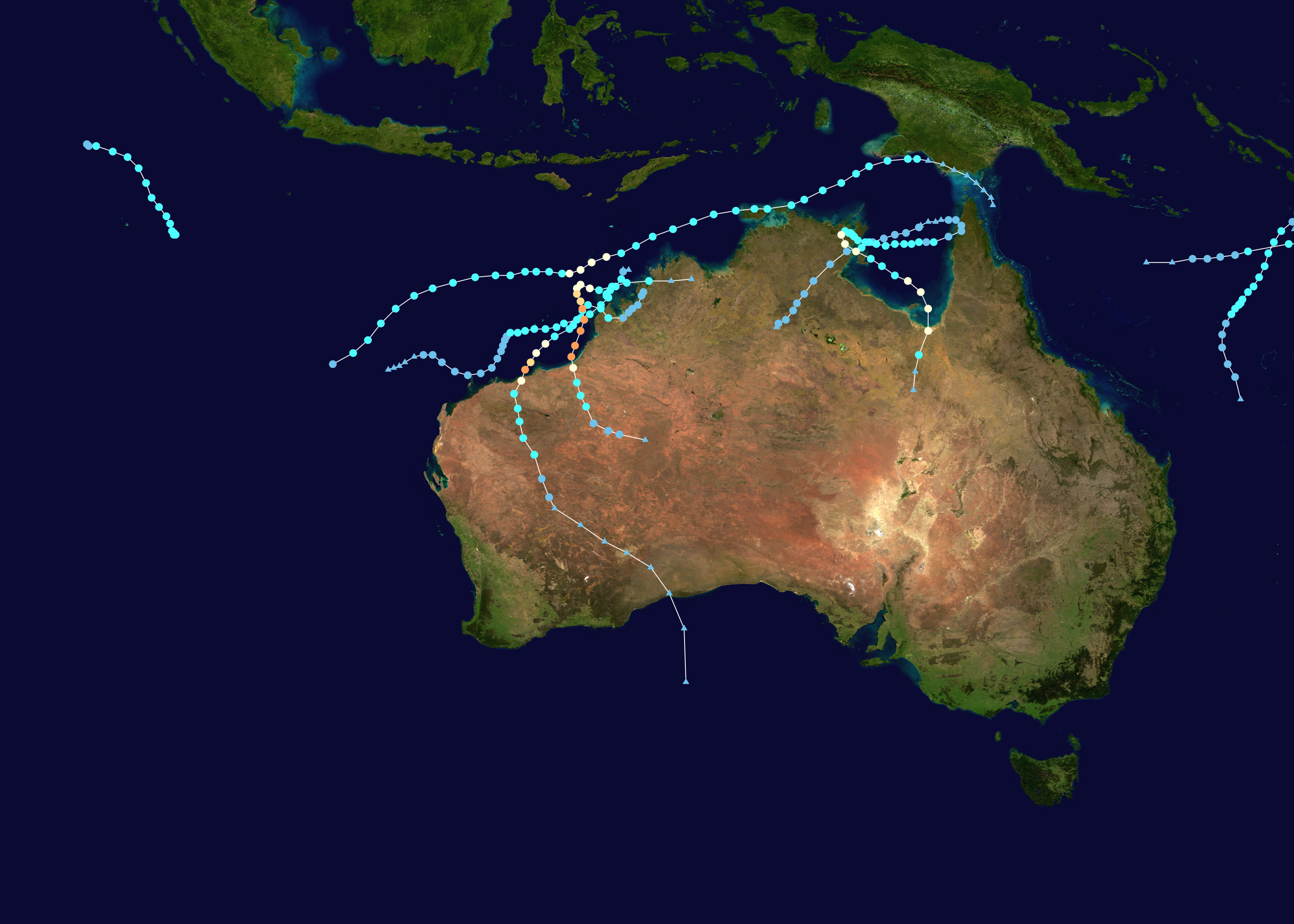
- Season summary map

Seasonal boundaries
- First system formed: 9 January 1987 (record latest)
- Last system dissipated: 27 May 1987

Strongest storm
- Name: Elsie
  - Maximum winds: 215 km/h (130 mph)
  - Lowest pressure: 940 hPa (mbar)

Seasonal statistics
- Tropical lows: 9, 1 unofficial
- Tropical cyclones: 8, 1 unofficial
- Severe tropical cyclones: 3
- Total fatalities: Unknown
- Total damage: Unknown

Related articles
- 1986–87 South-West Indian Ocean cyclone season; 1986–87 South Pacific cyclone season

The 1986–87 Australian region cyclone season was the latest starting Australian season on record. A below-average tropical cyclone season, it officially started on 1 November 1986, and officially ended on 30 April 1987, with the last system dissipating on 27 May.

== Systems ==
=== Tropical Storm 07S ===
- Tropical storm (SSHWS)
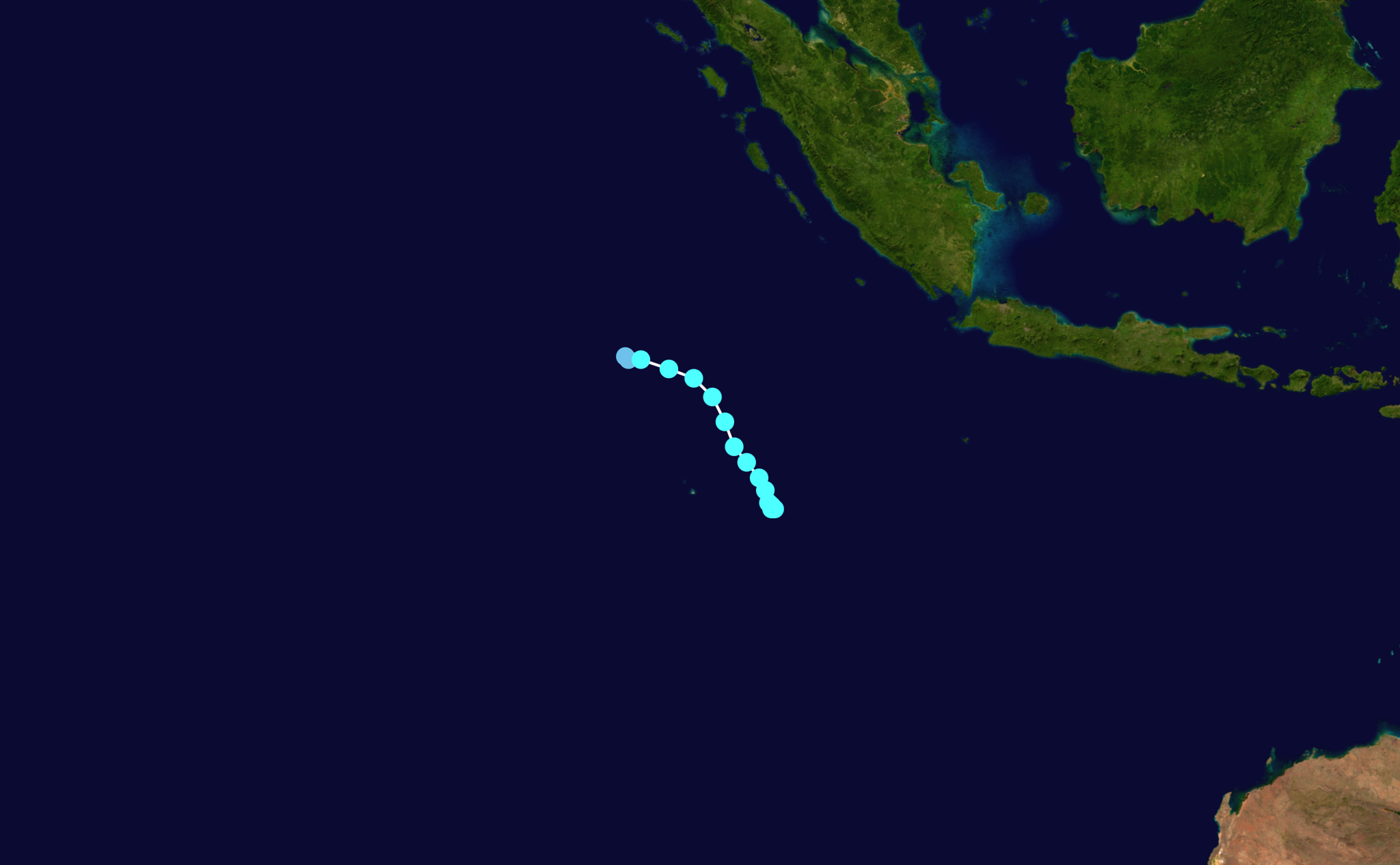
- Duration: 9 January – 13 January
- Peak intensity: 100 km/h (65 mph) (1-min);

07S existed from 9 to 13 January 1987, in the northwest corner of the basin. While the system was not monitored by the Bureau of Meteorology, it was considered a tropical storm by the Joint Typhoon Warning Center (JTWC).

=== Severe Tropical Cyclone Connie ===
- Category 3 severe tropical cyclone (Australian scale)
- Category 3 tropical cyclone (SSHWS)
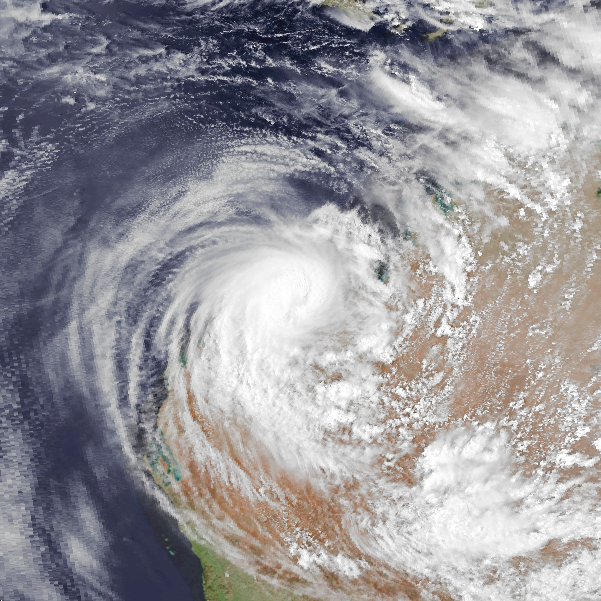
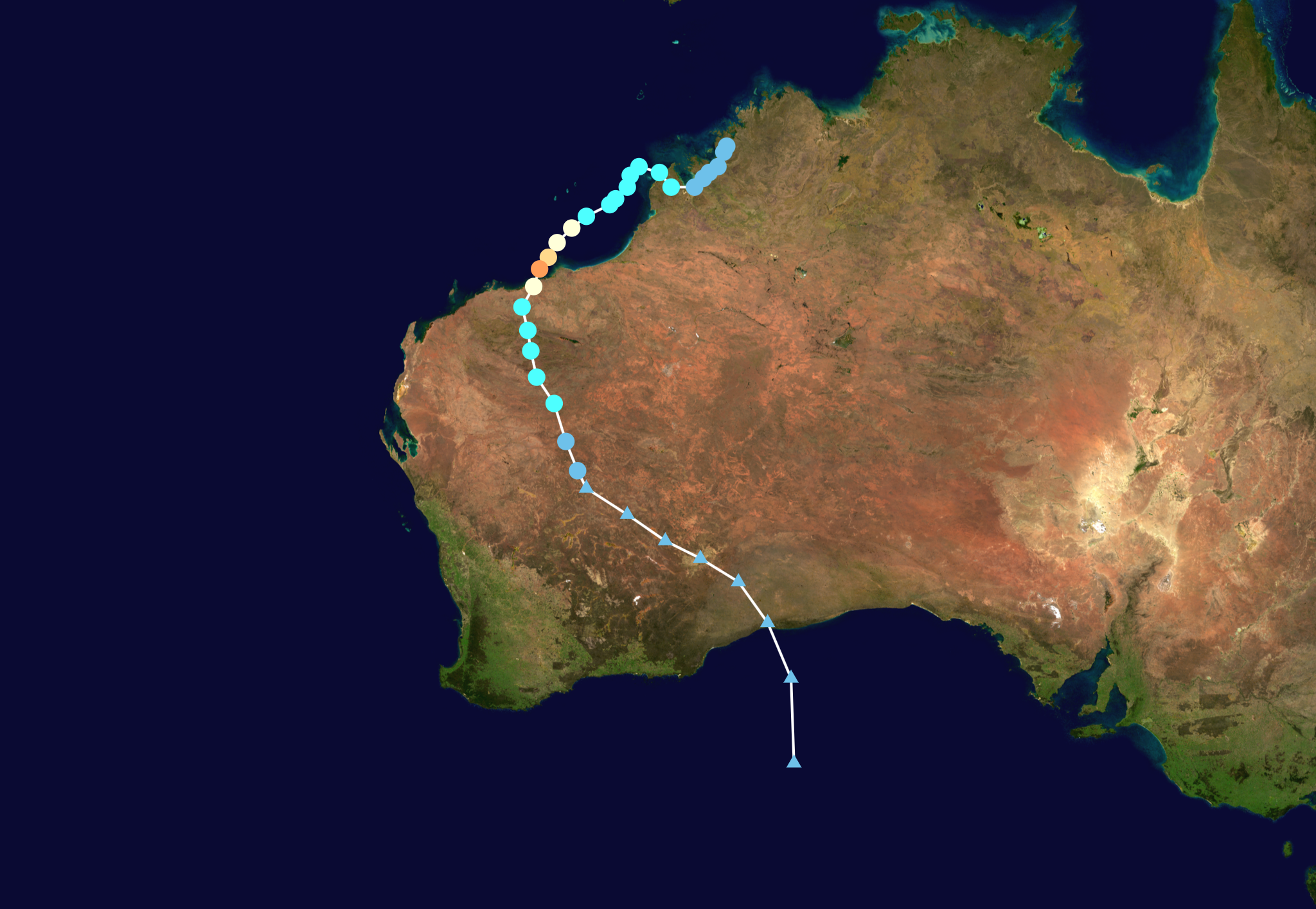
- Duration: 15 January – 23 January
- Peak intensity: 155 km/h (100 mph) (10-min); 950 hPa (mbar)

Connie, 15 to 23 January 1987. Made landfall over Port Hedland on 19 January. Moderate damage was reported in Port Hedland and Whim Creek.

=== Tropical Cyclone Irma ===
- Category 2 tropical cyclone (Australian scale)
- Tropical storm (SSHWS)
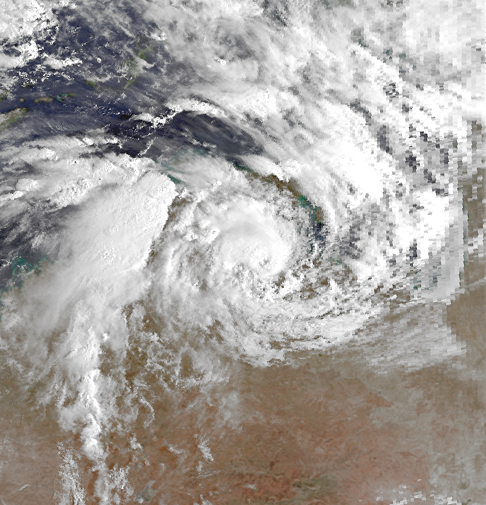
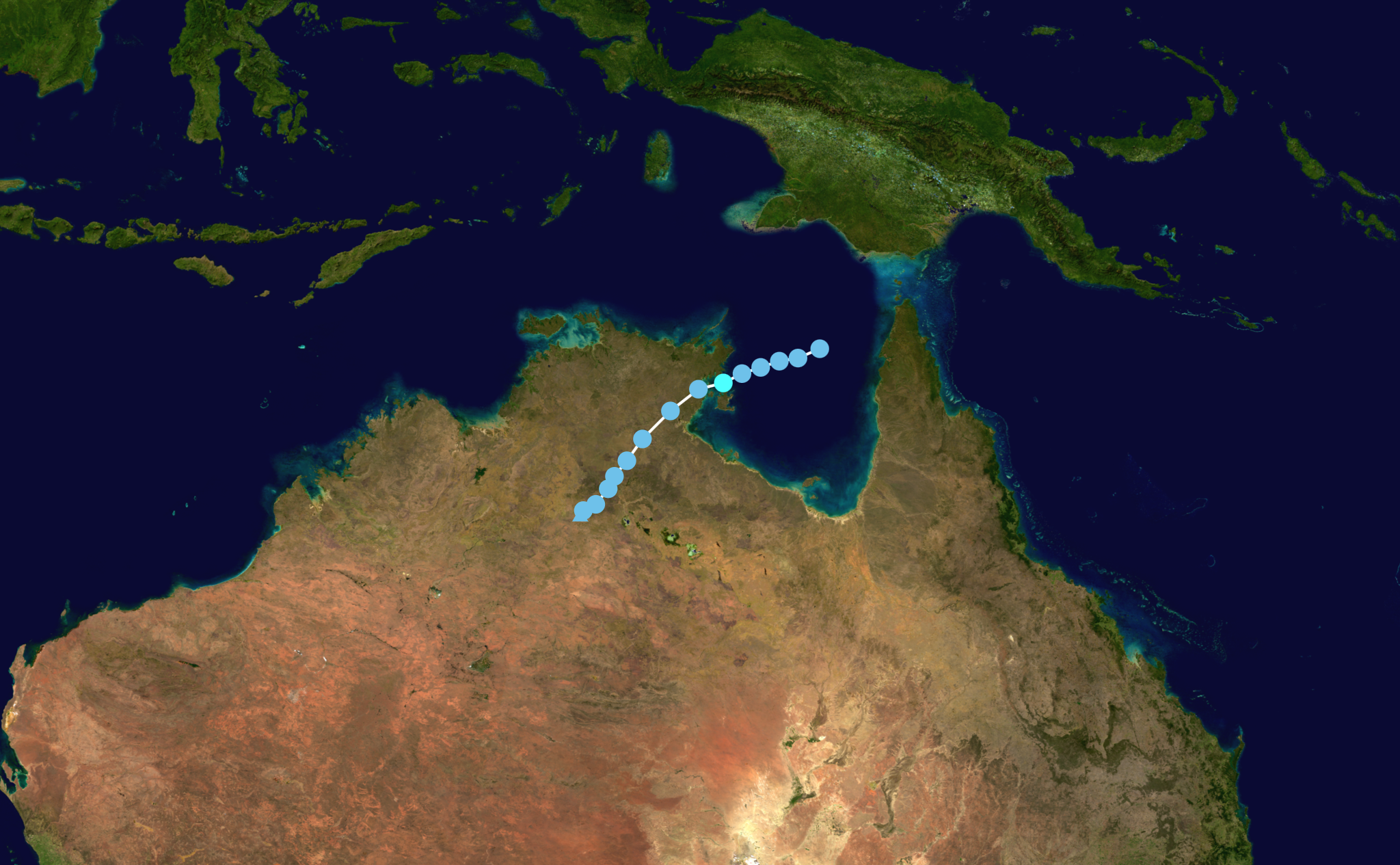
- Duration: 19 January – 22 January
- Peak intensity: 110 km/h (70 mph) (10-min); 978 hPa (mbar)

Irma, 19 to 22 January 1987, Gulf of Carpentaria.

=== Tropical Cyclone Damien ===
- Category 2 tropical cyclone (Australian scale)
- Tropical storm (SSHWS)
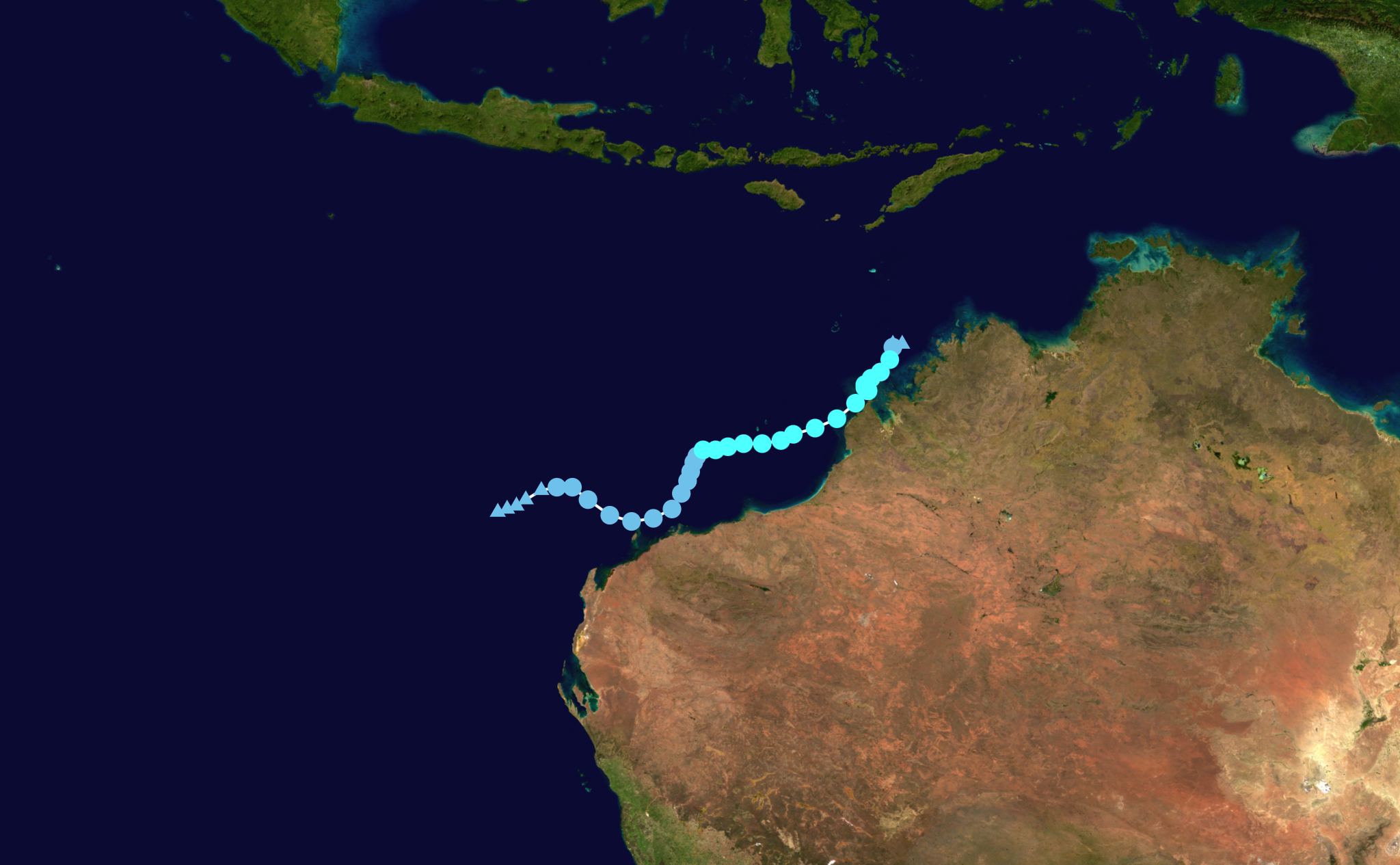
- Duration: 30 January – 9 February
- Peak intensity: 95 km/h (60 mph) (10-min); 980 hPa (mbar)

Damien, 30 January to 9 February 1987, near Western Australia.

=== Severe Tropical Cyclone Jason ===
- Category 3 severe tropical cyclone (Australian scale)
- Category 1 tropical cyclone (SSHWS)
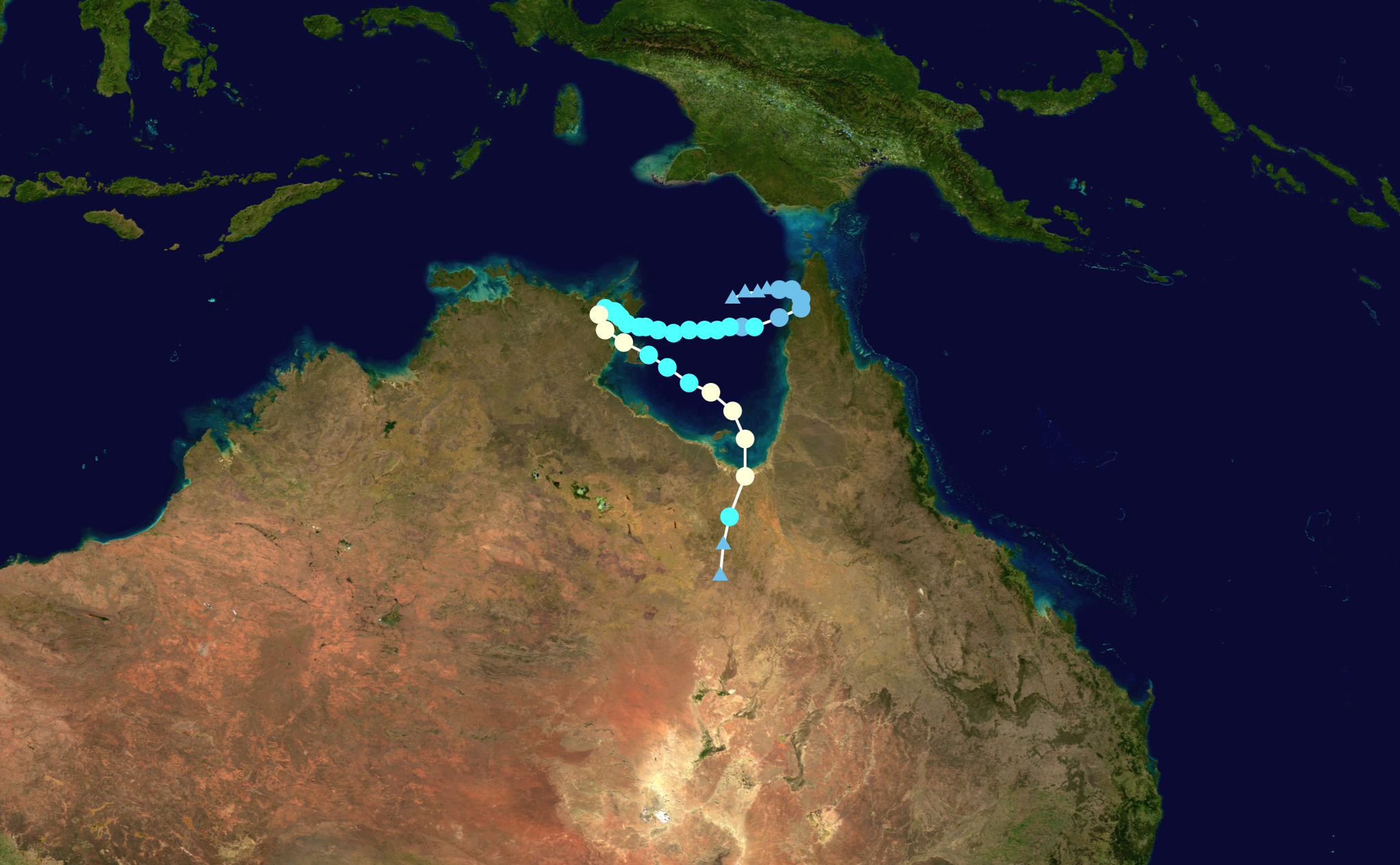
- Duration: 4 February – 14 February
- Peak intensity: 140 km/h (85 mph) (10-min); 970 hPa (mbar)

Jason stuck the Northern Territory in February, 1987 damaging 20 buildings.

=== Tropical Cyclone Veli ===
- Category 1 tropical cyclone (Australian scale)
- Tropical storm (SSHWS)
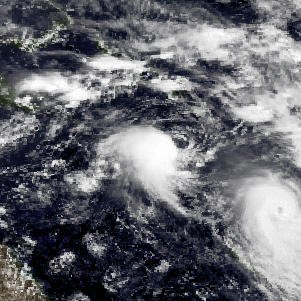
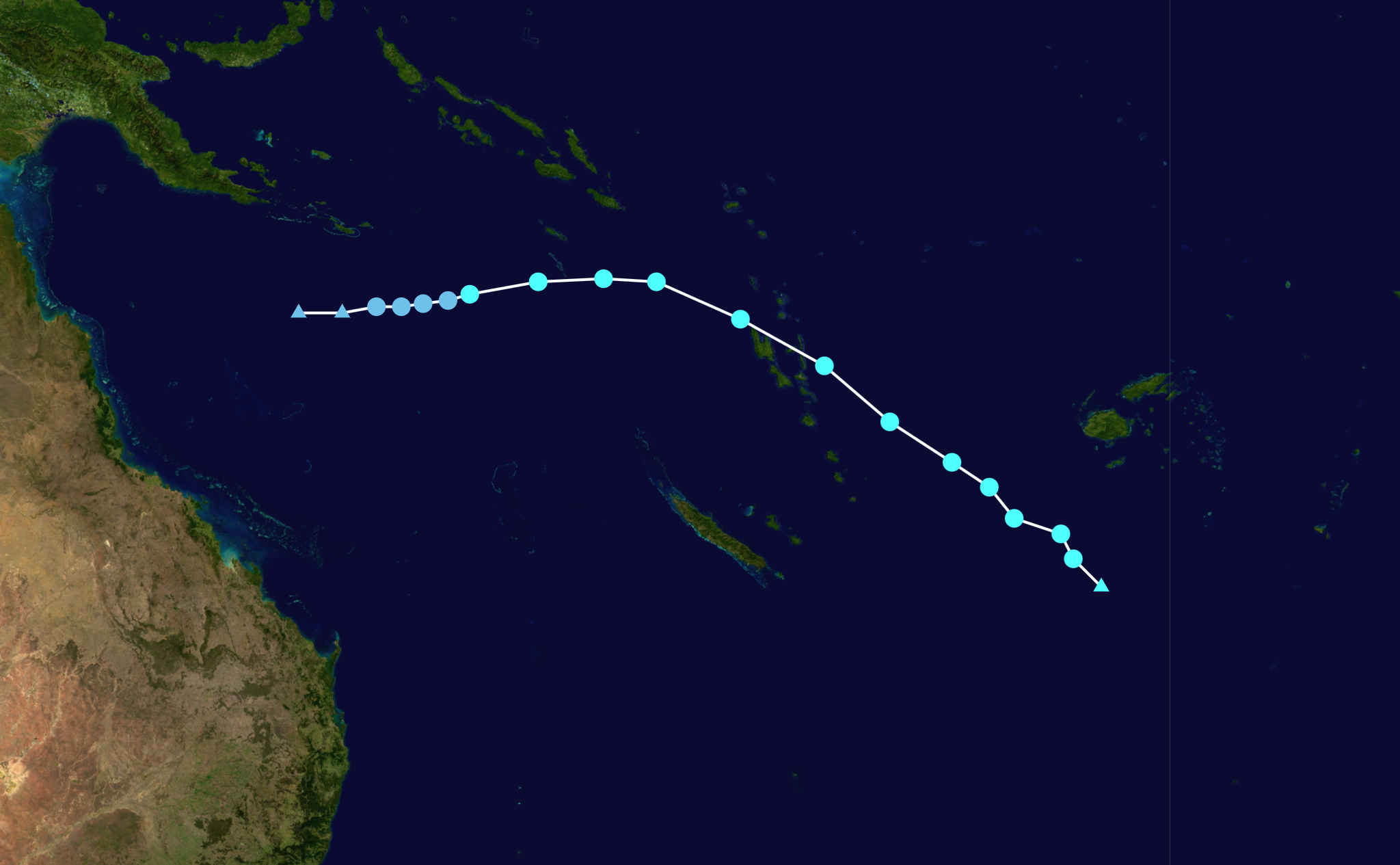
- Duration: 5 February – 7 February (exited basin)
- Peak intensity: 85 km/h (50 mph) (10-min); 987 hPa (mbar)

The precursor tropical low to Cyclone Veli formed during the next day, about 725 km (450 mi) to the south-east of Port Moresby in Papua New Guinea. During the next day, the low moved eastward and gradually developed further, before it became equivalent to a category 1 tropical cyclone on the Australian scale, as it reached its 10-minute sustained windspeeds of 85 km/h (55 mph). As the system continued to move eastwards it crossed 160°E and moved into the South Pacific basin during 7 February, before TCWC Nadi named it Veli later that day on the basis of satellite derived evidence.

=== Severe Tropical Cyclone Elsie ===
- Category 4 severe tropical cyclone (Australian scale)
- Category 3 tropical cyclone (SSHWS)
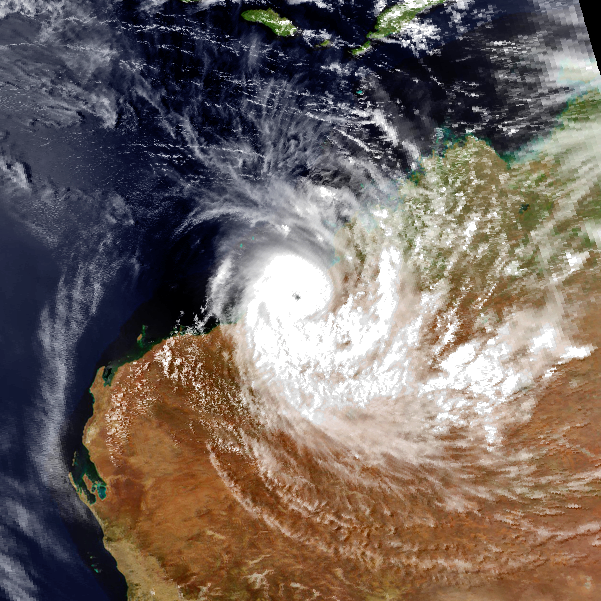
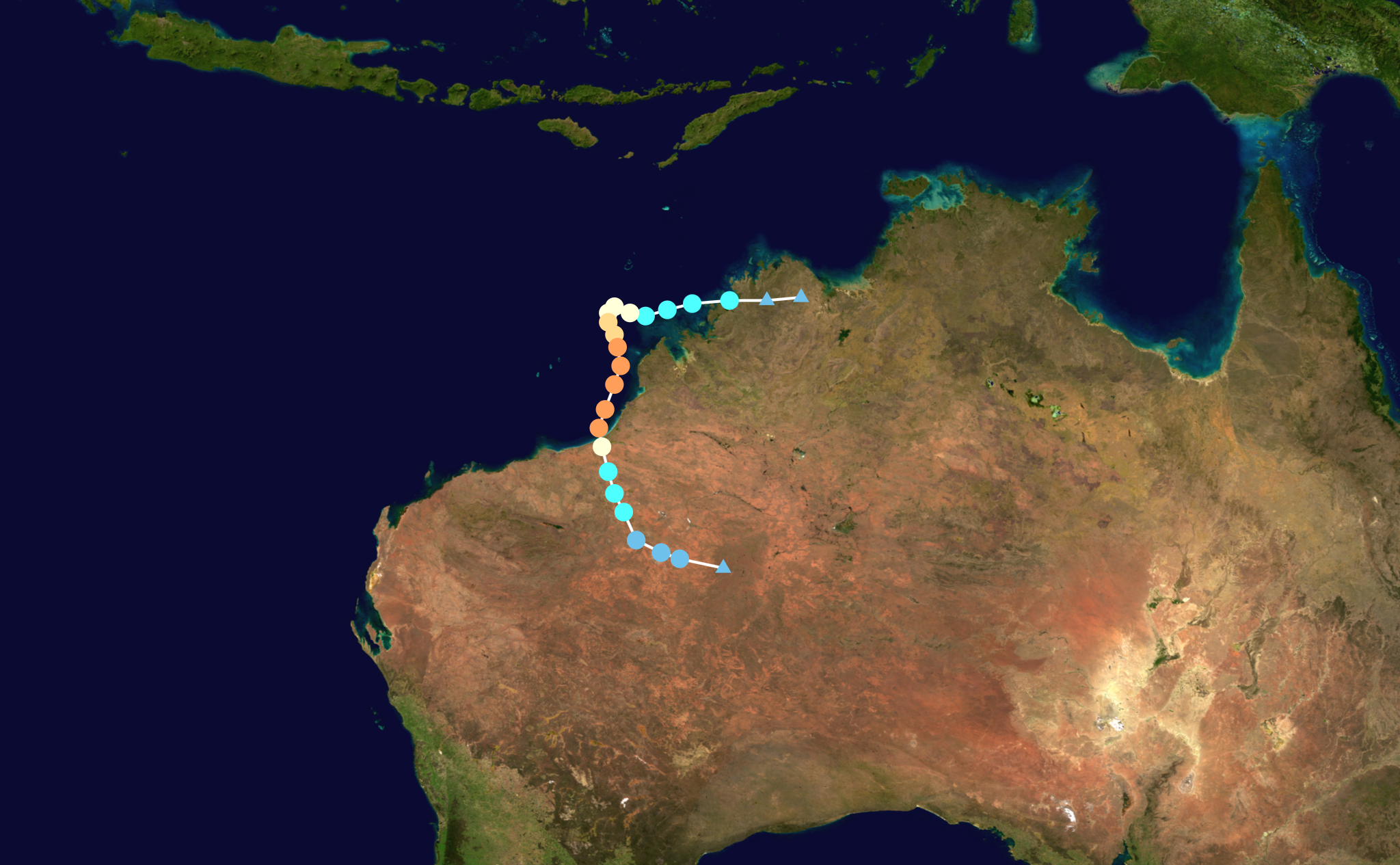
- Duration: 21 February – 27 February
- Peak intensity: 185 km/h (115 mph) (10-min); 940 hPa (mbar)

On 21 February, Cyclone Elsie formed near Western Australia. The storm then made landfall near the same region. Catastrophic damage was reported at Mandora Station.

=== Tropical Cyclone Kay ===
- Category 2 tropical cyclone (Australian scale)
- Category 1 tropical cyclone (SSHWS)
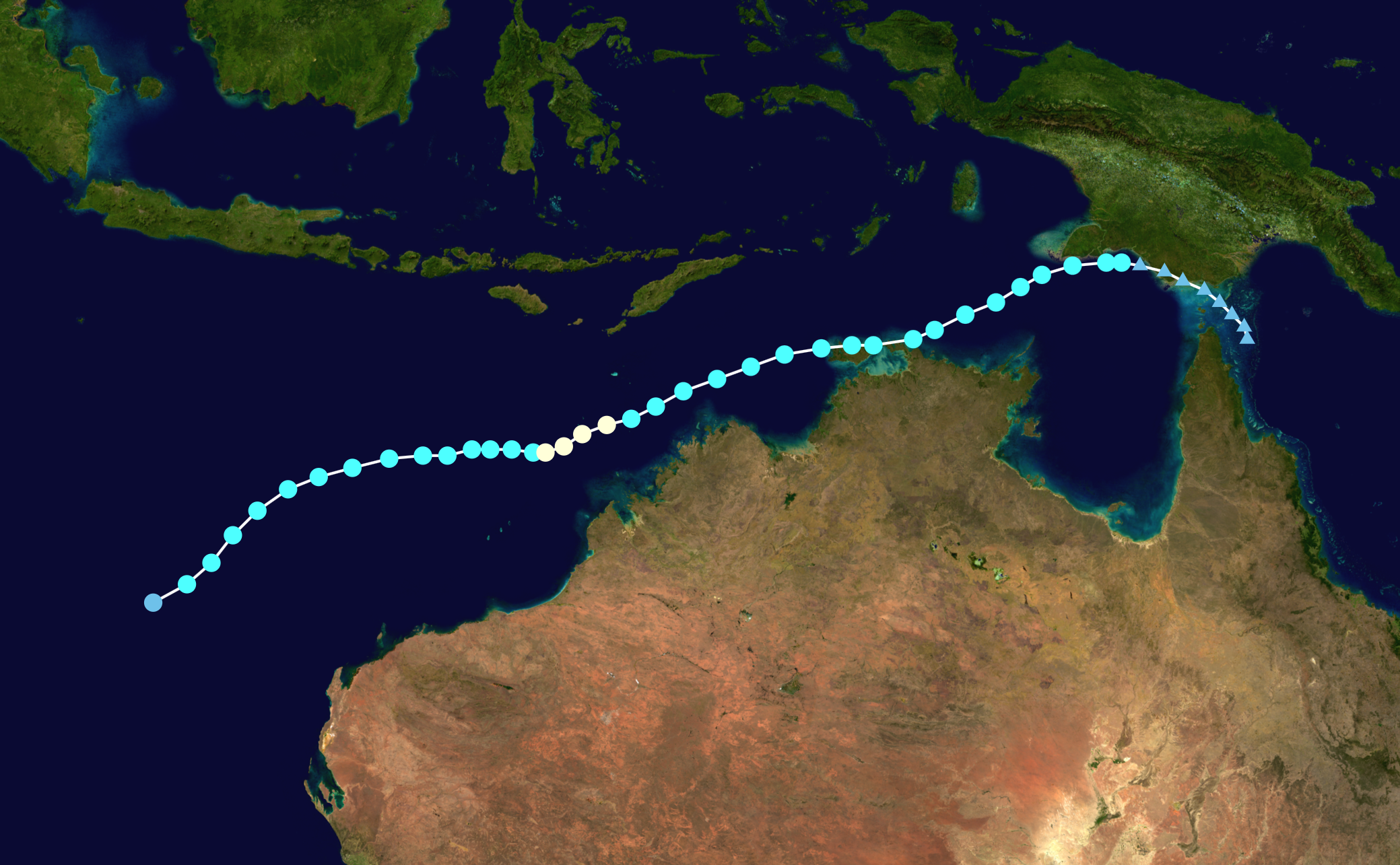
- Duration: 6 April – 17 April
- Peak intensity: 110 km/h (70 mph) (10-min); 976 hPa (mbar)

Kay lasted from 6 to 17 April 1987. The storm impacted Papua New Guinea and Western Australia.

=== Tropical Cyclone Blanche ===
- Category 1 tropical cyclone (Australian scale)
- Tropical storm (SSHWS)
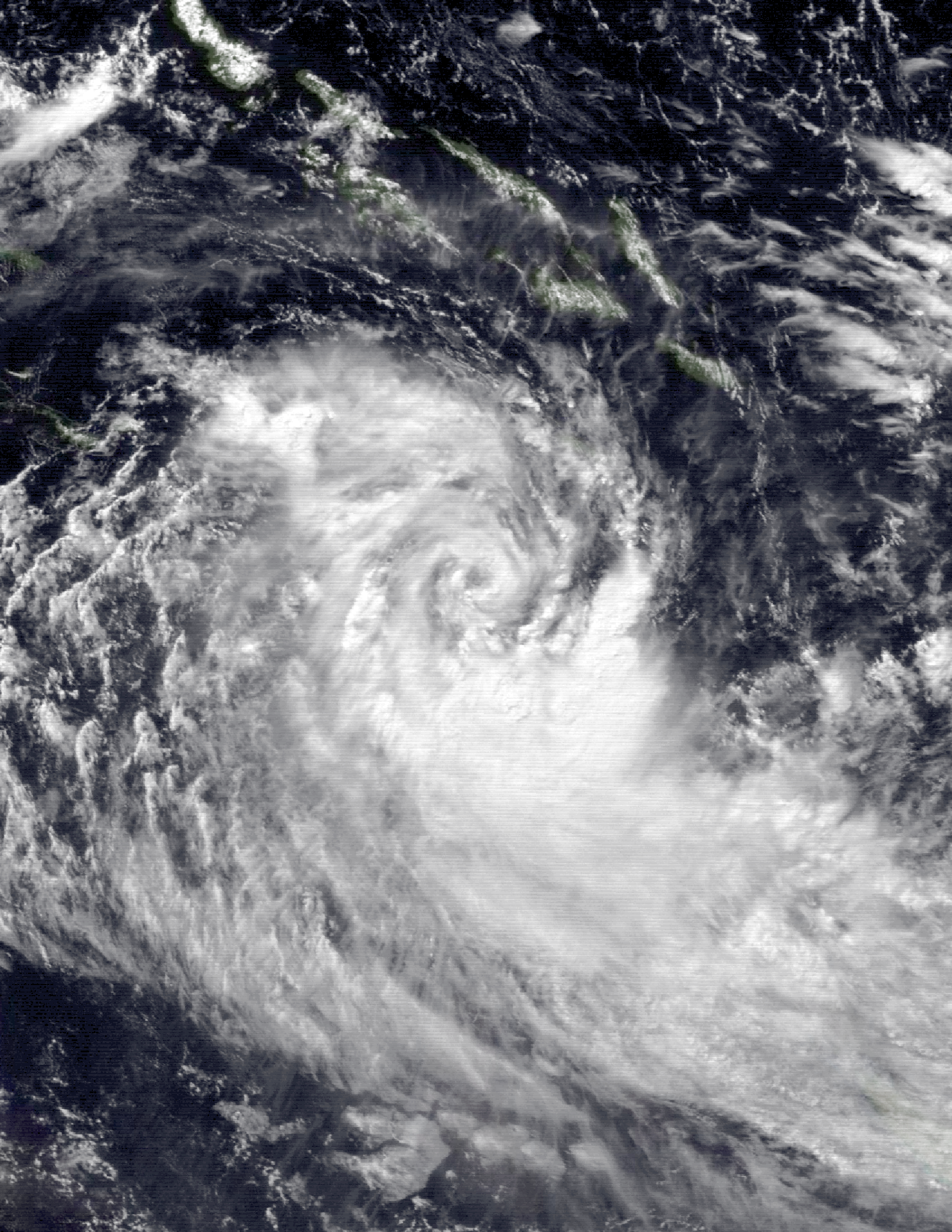
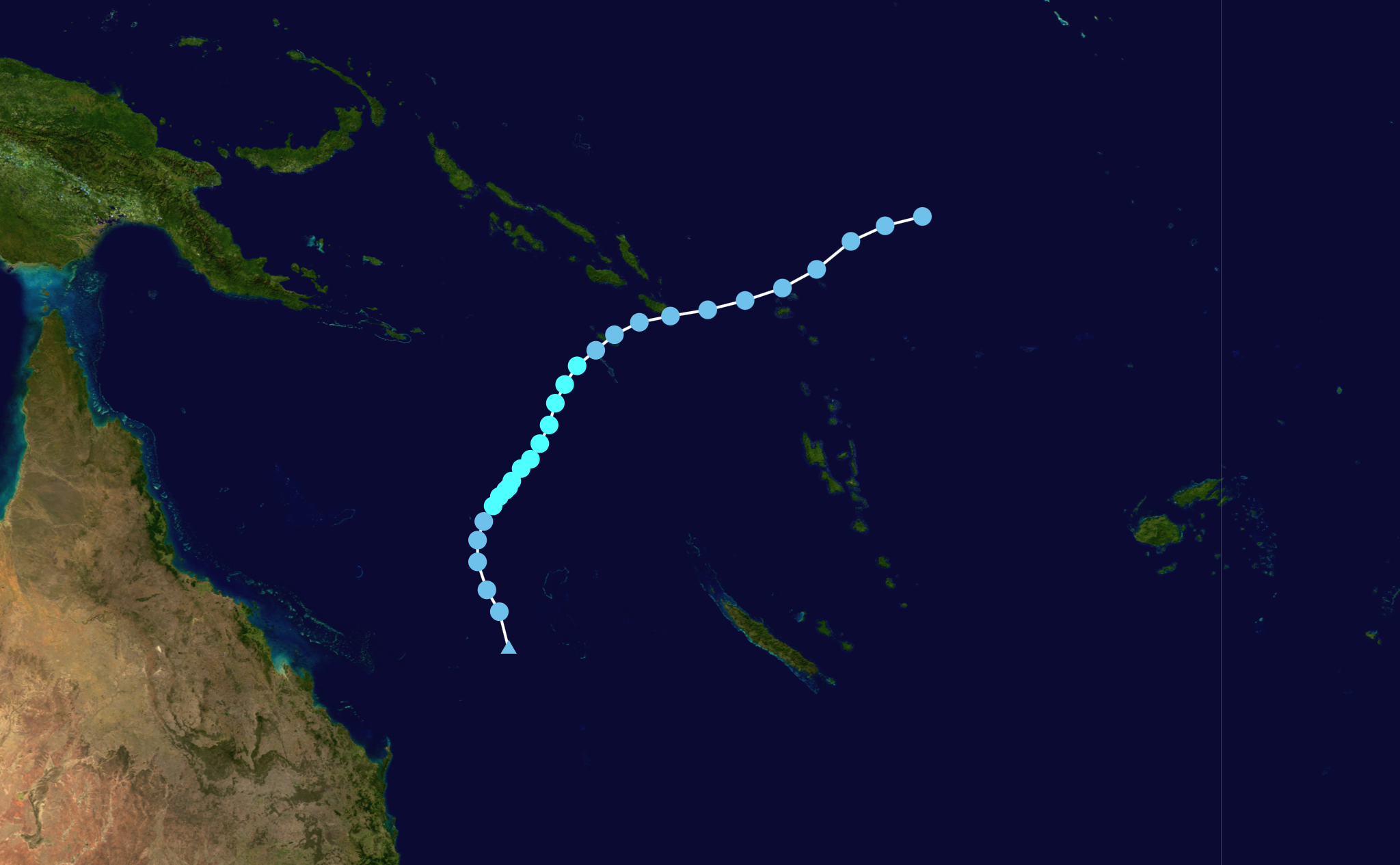
- Duration: 22 May (entered basin) – 27 May
- Peak intensity: 85 km/h (50 mph) (10-min); 990 hPa (mbar)

Blanch, entered the Australian region basin on 22 May, and dissipated on 27 May 1987, off the east coast of Australia.

=== Other system ===
The precursor tropical low to Cyclone Uma formed within the region on 4 February, before it crossed 160°E and moved into the South Pacific basin later that day.

== Seasonal effects ==
Name	Dates	Peak intensity			Areas affected	Damages (AU$)	Damages (US$)	Deaths
Name	Dates	Category	Wind speed (km/h (mph))	Pressure (hPa)	Areas affected	Damages (AU$)	Damages (US$)	Deaths
Connie	15–23 January	Category 3 tropical cyclone	155 km/h (95 mph)	950 hPa (28.05 inHg)	Western Australia			
Irma	19–22 January	Category 2 tropical cyclone	110 km/h (70 mph)	978 hPa (28.88 inHg)	Western Australia, Northern Territory			
Damien	30 January – 9 February	Category 2 tropical cyclone	95 km/h (60 mph)	980 hPa (28.94 inHg)	Western Australia			
Uma	4 February	Tropical Low	55 km/h (35 mph)	997 hPa (29.4 inHg)	None	None	None	None
Jason	4–14 February	Category 3 severe tropical cyclone	140 km/h (85 mph)	970 hPa (28.64 inHg)	Northern Territory, Queensland			
Veli	5–7 February	Category 1 tropical cyclone	85 km/h (55 mph)	987 hPa (29.15 inHg)	None	None	None	None
Elsie	21–27 February	Category 4 severe tropical cyclone	185 km/h (115 mph)	940 hPa (27.76 inHg)	Northern Territory, Western Australia	Significant	Significant	
Kay	19–26 April	Category 2 tropical cyclone	100 km/h (60 mph)	975 hPa (28.79 inHg)	Queensland, Papua New Guinea, Northern Territory, Western Australia			
Blanch(e)	22–27 May	Category 1 tropical cyclone	110 km/h (70 mph)	990 hPa (29.23 inHg)	Solomon Islands, Vanuatu			
Season aggregates
9 systems	20 November – 27 May		185 km/h (115 mph)	940 hPa (27.76 inHg)		Unknown		

== See also ==
- Atlantic hurricane seasons: 1987, 1988
- Eastern Pacific hurricane seasons: 1987, 1988
- Western Pacific typhoon seasons: 1987, 1988
- North Indian Ocean cyclone seasons: 1987, 1988
