= Robert Conny =

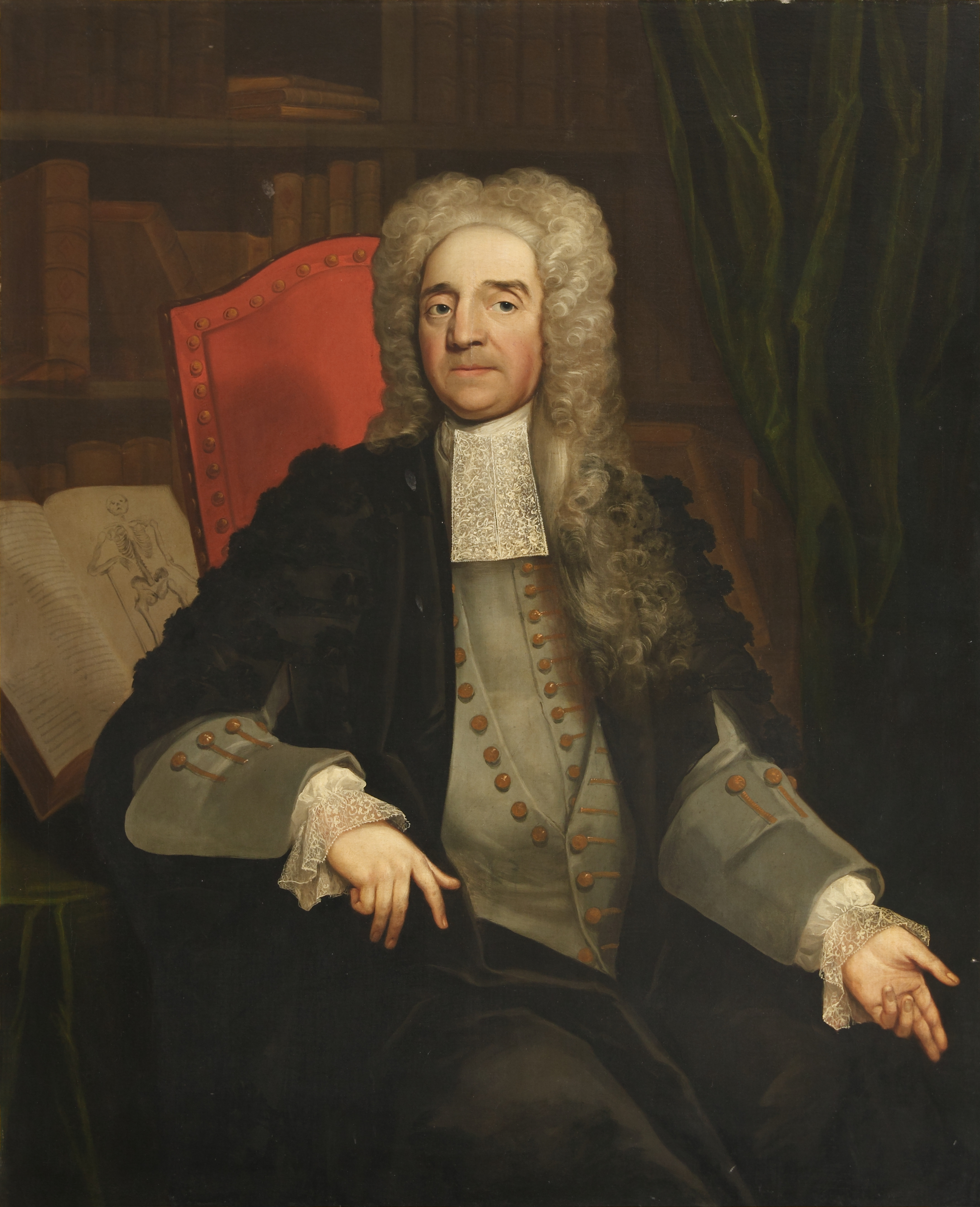
Robert Conny by Alexander van der Hagen, 1722

Robert Conny (also Cony; 1645?–1713), was an English physician.

Conny was the son of John Conny, as well as a surgeon and twice mayor of Rochester. He was born in approximately 1645. He was a member of Magdalen College, Oxford, and earned his B.A. on 8 June 1676, M.A. on 3 May 1679, M.B. on 2 May 1682, and M.D. on 9 July 1685. When receiving his M.D., Conny 'denied and protested,' because the vice-chancellor allowed a bullard of New College to be presented his LL.B. before him.

In 1692, he was employed by the admiralty as physician to the sick and wounded in Deal. He married Frances, daughter of Richard Manley. He contributed a paper, in the form of a letter to Dr. Plot, 'On a Shower of Fishes,' to the 'Philosophical Transactions', and is said to have been a successful physician, and to have improved the practice of lithotomy. He died on 25 May 1713, at the age of 68, and was buried in Rochester Cathedral. His portrait is displayed in the Bodleian Picture Gallery and in the lodgings of the president of Magdalen College.
