= 1987–88 South-West Indian Ocean cyclone season =

Cyclone season in the Southwest Indian Ocean

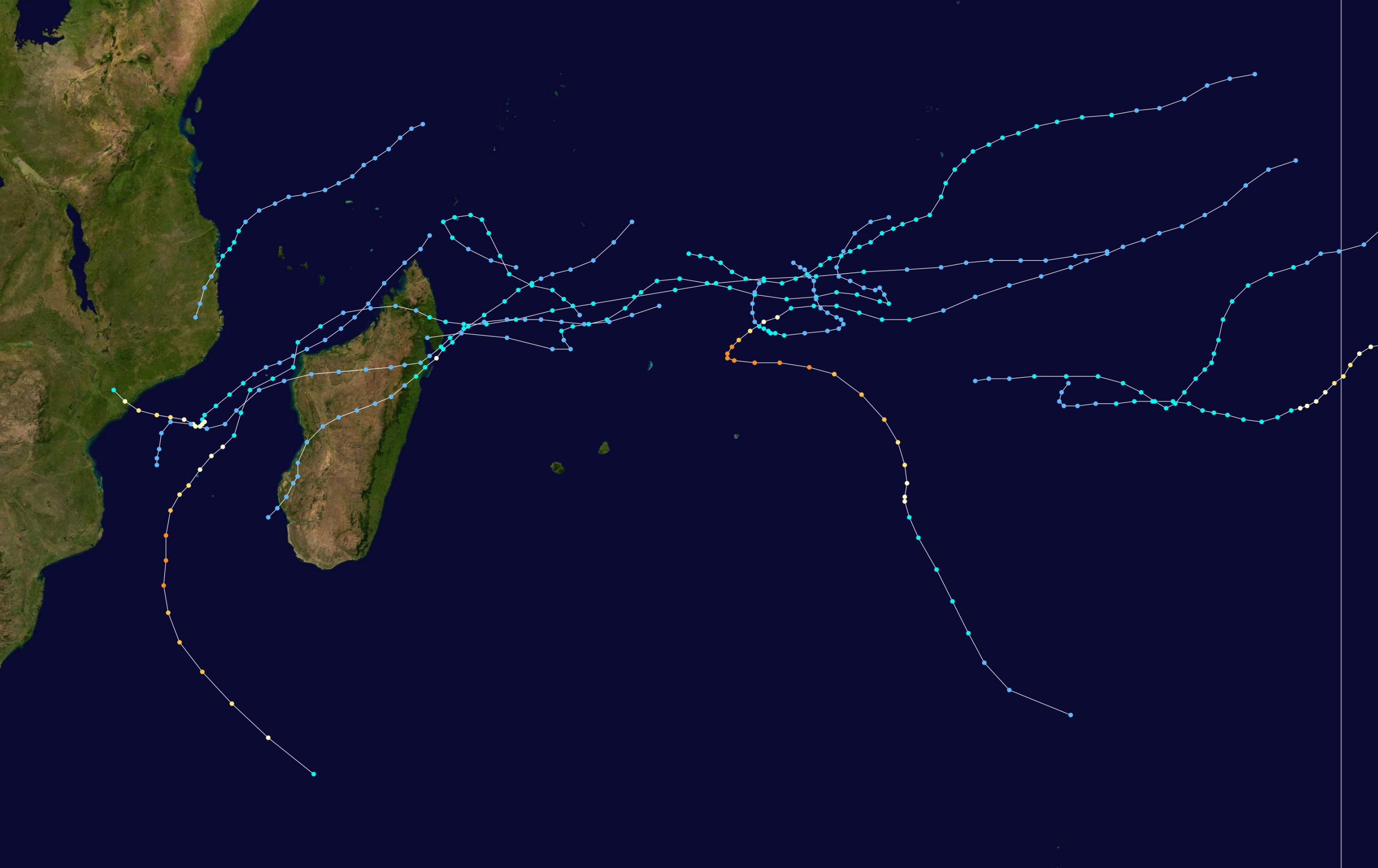
- Season summary map

Seasonal boundaries
- First system formed: December 9, 1987
- Last system dissipated: May 14, 1988

Strongest storm
- Name: Gasitao
  - Maximum winds: 240 km/h (150 mph) (10-minute sustained)
  - Lowest pressure: 900 hPa (mbar)

Seasonal statistics
- Total disturbances: 9, 2 unofficial
- Total depressions: 9, 2 unofficial
- Total storms: 9, 2 unofficial
- Tropical cyclones: 4
- Intense tropical cyclones: 1
- Total fatalities: 100
- Total damage: $10 million (1988 USD)

Related articles
- 1987–88 Australian region cyclone season; 1987–88 South Pacific cyclone season

The 1987–88 South-West Indian Ocean cyclone season was a moderately active cyclone season, with nine named storms. Four of the storms attained tropical cyclone status, which is the equivalent of a minimal hurricane with 10 minute sustained winds of at least 120 km/h (75 mph). (Note: All wind speeds in the article are sustained over 10 minute, unless otherwise stated.) The seasonal activity was evenly dispersed, officially beginning on December 9 when the Météo-France office (MFR) on Réunion started tracking Tropical Storm Ariny. The storm crossed 90° E from the adjacent Australian basin, one of two storms in the season to do so along with Cyclone Ezenina. There were also two storms tracked unofficially by the Joint Typhoon Warning Center (JTWC) in November.

Cyclone Filao was the most notable storm of the season, originating in late February off northern Madagascar. It ultimately struck Mozambique on March 1, where it killed about 100 people and left $10 million in damage (1988 USD). In January, both tropical storms Calidera and Doaza crossed Madagascar, the latter of which helped end a drought. Long-lasting Tropical Storm Hely also struck the country in March. The strongest cyclone of the season was Gasitao, which formed at the same time as Hely and attained peak winds of 150 km/h (93 mph). The season ended when Tropical Storm Iarisena dissipated northeast of Madagascar in the middle of May.

== Seasonal summary ==
During the season, the Météo-France office (MFR) on Réunion island issued warnings in tropical cyclones within the basin. Using satellite imagery from National Oceanic and Atmospheric Administration, the agency estimated intensity through the Dvorak technique, and warned on tropical cyclones in the region from the coast of Africa to 90° E, south of the equator. The World Meteorological Organization recognized the MFR as a Regional Tropical Cyclone Advisory Centre in 1988, and would later label the agency as a Regional Specialized Meteorological Center in 1993. The Joint Typhoon Warning Center (JTWC), which is a joint United States Navy – United States Air Force task force, also issued tropical cyclone warnings for the southwestern Indian Ocean. The season's nine named storms is equal to the long term average, while the five tropical cyclones – a storm attaining maximum sustained winds of at least 120 km/h (75 mph) – was slightly below average. The MFR considered the tropical cyclone year to begin on August 1 and continue to July 31 of the following year.

In addition to the storms classified by the MFR, the JTWC tracked two storms in November. The first, classified as Tropical Cyclone 01S, formed on November 1, about halfway between Diego Garcia and Sumatra. It formed as a cyclone pair, along with a tropical storm in the northern Indian Ocean that struck India. The storm moved west-southwestward, passing near Diego Garcia on November 3. The JTWC assessed peak 1 minute winds of 105 km/h (65 mph) on November 7, although the storm subsequently weakened and dissipated on November 9. The other unofficial storm developed on November 24 near the eastern coast of Mozambique, classified as Tropical Cyclone 02S. Moving to the southwest, it quickly intensified to reach winds of 75 km/h (47 mph). Early on November 25, the storm moved ashore near Quirimbas National Park in the northeastern portion of Mozambique, and it dissipated a day later.

== Systems ==
=== Severe Tropical Storm Ariny ===
- Severe tropical storm (MFR)
- Tropical storm (SSHWS)
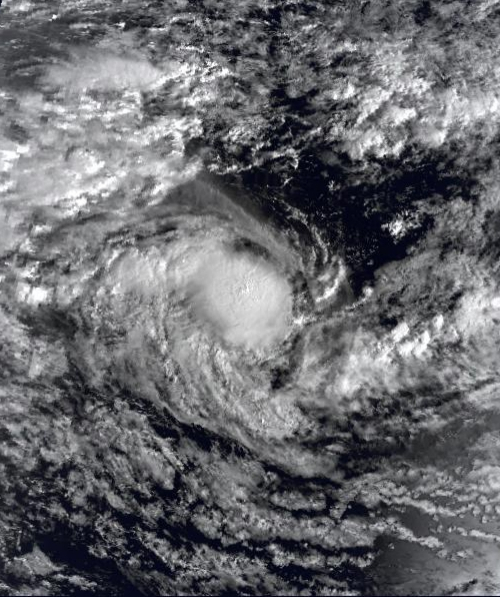
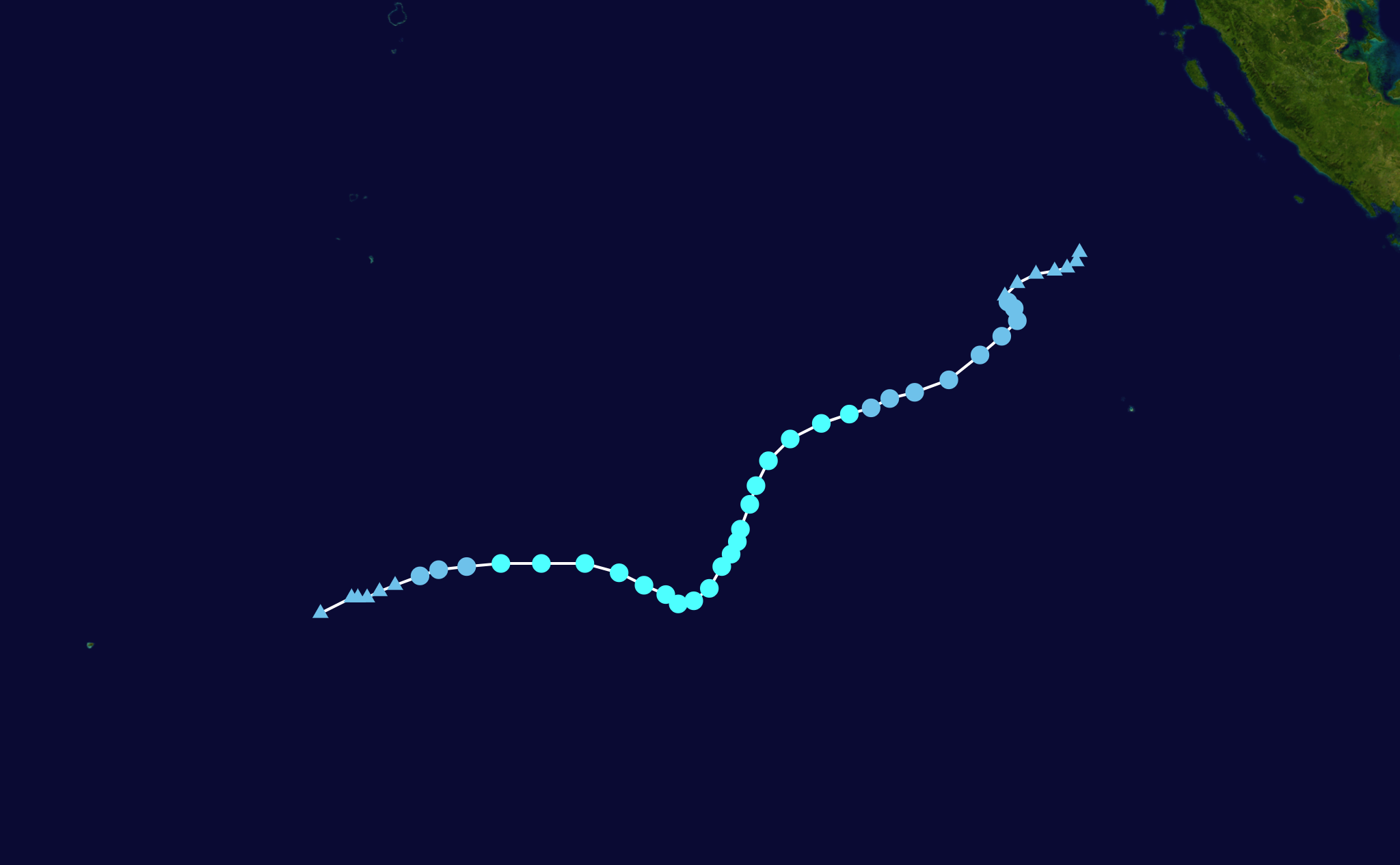
- Duration: December 9 (Entered basin) – December 16
- Peak intensity: 115 km/h (70 mph) (10-min); 966 hPa (mbar)

For several days, the JTWC tracked a southwest moving area of disturbed weather in the Australian basin until it crossed 90° E on December 9, located within the Intertropical Convergence Zone (ITCZ). Around that time, the Australian Bureau of Meteorology (BoM) classified it as a tropical depression, and the JTWC labeled it as Tropical Cyclone 03S. On December 10, the MFR began tracking the system due to the appearance on satellite imagery, their first of the season. Based on the organization, the Mauritius Meteorological Services named it Ariny, and the storm soon after attained peak winds of 115 km/h (71 mph), just shy of tropical cyclone status. The storm turned more to the south-southwest due to a weakness within a ridge to the south. However, the ridge strengthened and turned Ariny back to the west into an unfavorable environment, causing weakening. It dissipated on December 16 to the south of Diego Garcia.

=== Moderate Tropical Storm Benandro ===
- Moderate tropical storm (MFR)
- Tropical storm (SSHWS)
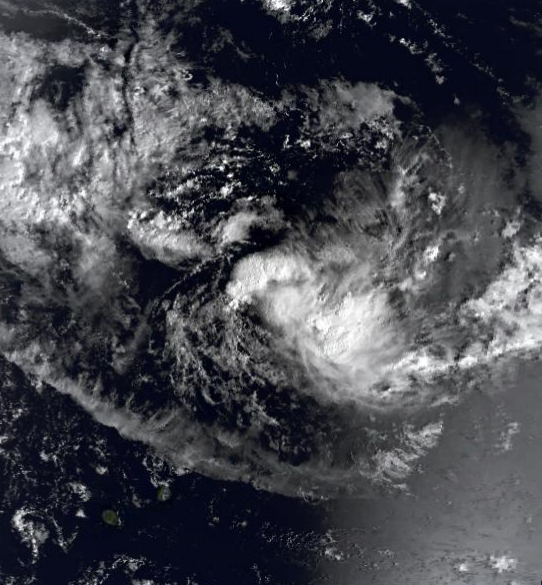
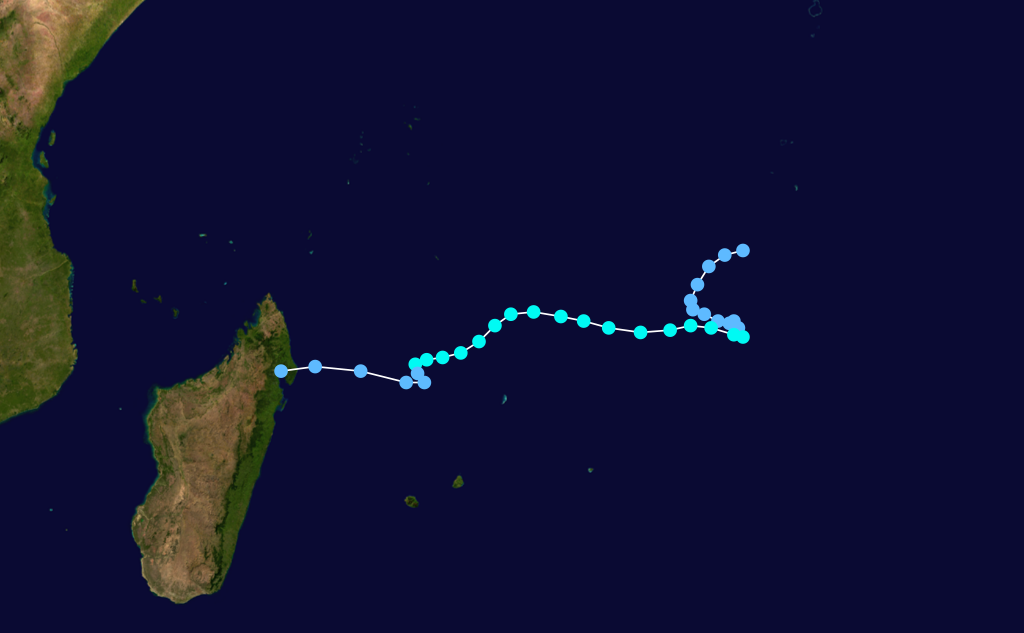
- Duration: December 25 – January 4
- Peak intensity: 65 km/h (40 mph) (10-min); 991 hPa (mbar)

An area of convection, or thunderstorms, formed on December 24 between St. Brandon and Diego Garcia. On the next day, it developed into a tropical disturbance, although it quickly intensified to moderate tropical storm status by December 26, resulting in the Mauritius Meteorological Services naming it Bernandro. By that time, the storm was moving to the east, although soon after it turned to the south and then west. On December 27, the JTWC began tracking Bernandro, classifying it as Tropical Cyclone 05S. The storm vacillated in intensity between tropical storm and depression statuses for several days due to persistent wind shear, reaching peak winds of only 65 km/h (40 mph). On December 31, Bernandro passed about 140 km (87 mi) north of St. Brandon as a tropical disturbance. Although the JTWC tracked the storm westward into northeastern Madagascar, the MFR followed the center as turning to the south and southeast. Bernandro passed about 60 km (37 mi) north of Réunion on January 2 before passing between there and Mauritius as a tropical depression. The weak system turned to the south, and it was no longer classified as a tropical depression on January 4. The remnant circulation persisted for several days. After a brief turn to the northwest on January 5, it resumed its southerly motion, dissipating on January 8.

While passing near Réunion, Bernandro was weak and produced wind gusts of 69 km/h (43 mph) on the island. The storm also produced a Foehn wind along the island. However, the latter portion of the storm's duration is uncertain due to its disorganization. The MFR noted that there was potentially a secondary circulation that passed near Réunion, and that Bernandro's circulation was very small during its passage.

=== Tropical Cyclone Calidera ===
- Tropical cyclone (MFR)
- Category 1 tropical cyclone (SSHWS)
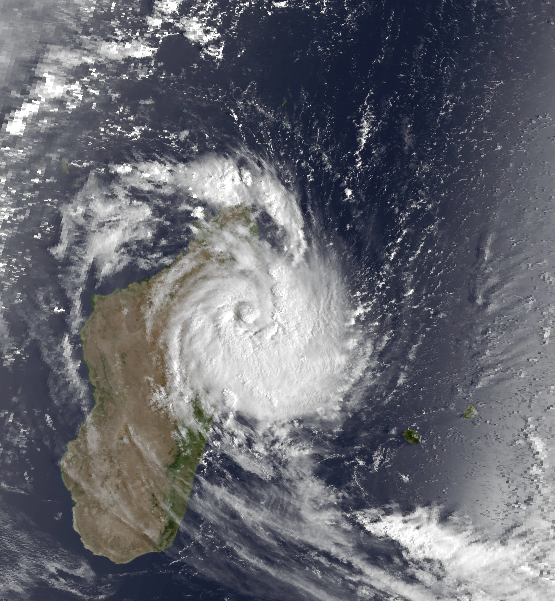
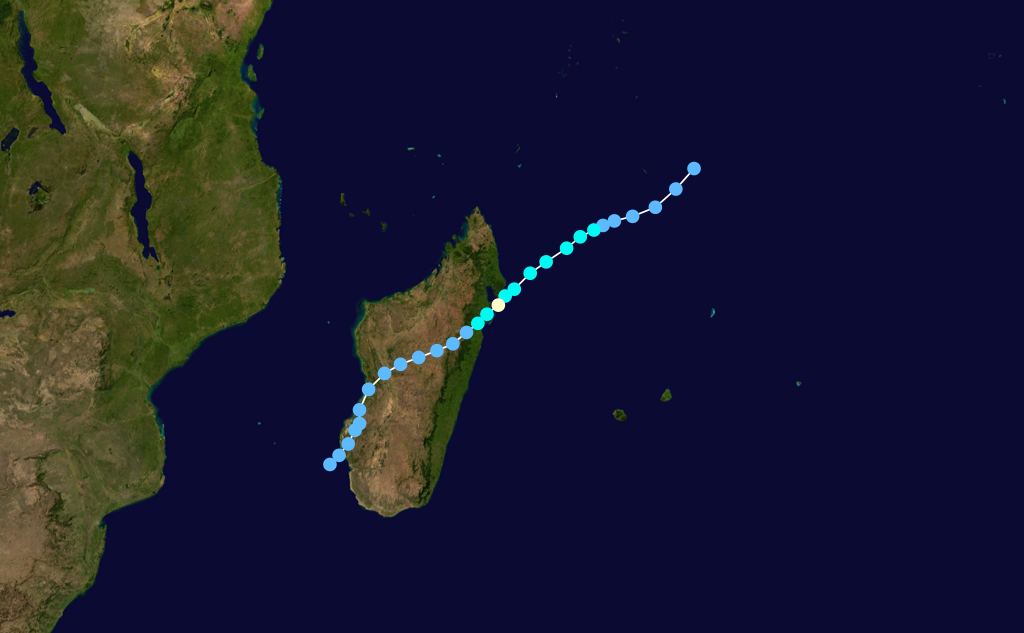
- Duration: January 11 – January 21
- Peak intensity: 120 km/h (75 mph) (10-min); 966 hPa (mbar)

A tropical disturbance formed on January 11 to the east of St. Brandon, having originated from a circulation that became evident the previous day. It moved to the southwest and gradually intensified, becoming a tropical storm on January 13. That day, the JTWC classified it as Tropical Cyclone 08S, and the Meteorological Service of Madagascar named it Calidera. By January 14, the storm intensified to attain peak winds of 115 km/h (71 mph), just shy of tropical cyclone status. Early on January 15, Calidera made landfall along Cape Masoala in eastern Madagascar at peak intensity. The JTWC assessed that the storm intensified to the equivalent of a minimal hurricane with 1 minute winds of 120 km/h (75 mph). Calidera quickly weakened over land as it crossed the country. It approached the coast near Morondava, although it remained over land and turned more to the south. The system emerged into the Mozambique Channel on January 19 as it turned to the south and southeast. On January 21, Calidera dissipated within the polar westerlies.

During its passage through Madagascar, Calidera produced gusts of 119 km/h (74 mph) along the offshore island of Île Sainte-Marie. Sustained winds there reached 91 km/h (57 mph).

=== Intense Tropical Cyclone Doaza ===
- Intense tropical cyclone (MFR)
- Category 4 tropical cyclone (SSHWS)
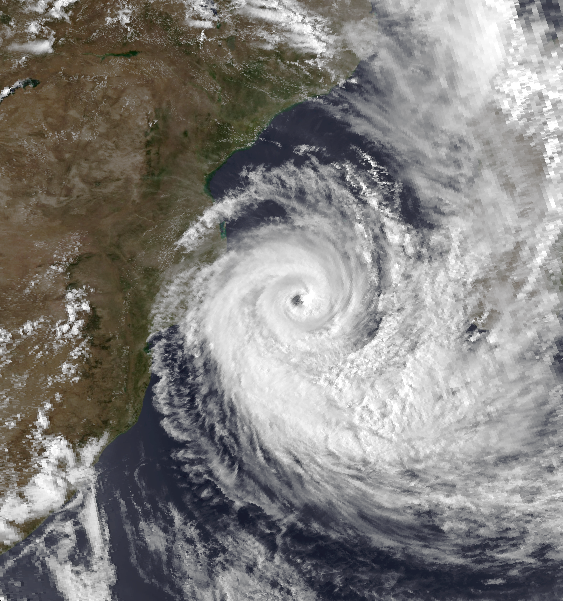
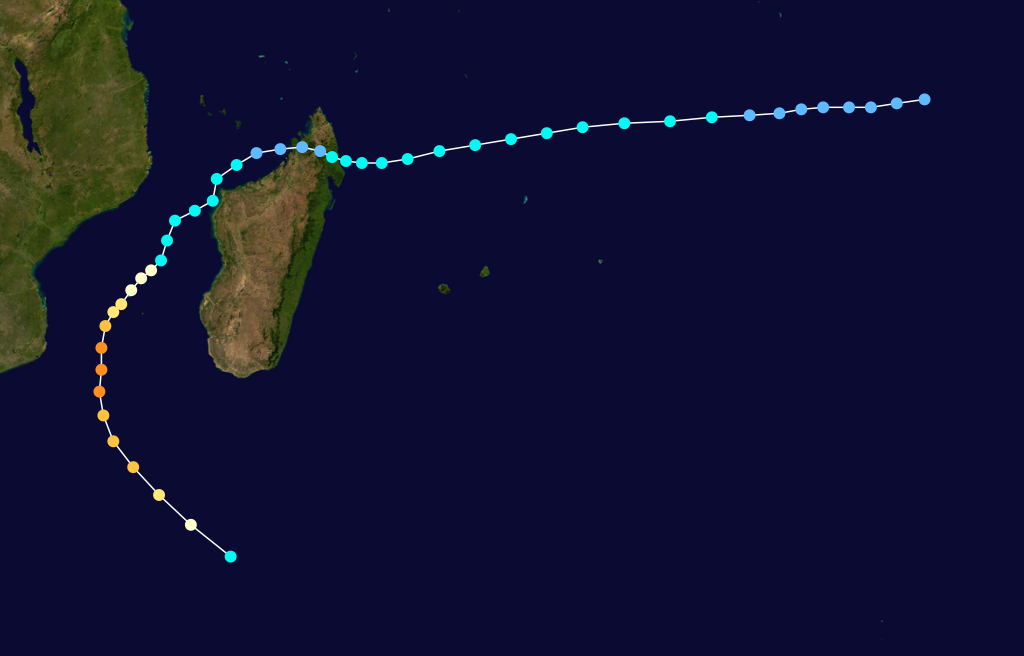
- Duration: January 22 – February 1
- Peak intensity: 185 km/h (115 mph) (10-min); 927 hPa (mbar)

On January 22, a tropical disturbance formed to the southeast of Diego Garcia. It moved generally to the west-southwest, intensifying into a tropical storm on January 23. That day, the Mauritius Meteorological Services named the storm Doaza, and the JTWC classified it as Tropical Cyclone 09S. On January 25, Doaza passed north of Tromelin Island, and around that time it attained an initial peak of 80 km/h (50 mph). Later that day, the storm struck eastern Madagascar near Île Sainte-Marie, and it quickly weakened over land, so much so that the JTWC discontinued advisories. However, Doaza emerged into the Mozambique Channel on January 26 near Mahajanga and soon after reorganized while curving to the south. The JTWC again issued advisories on January 28, around which time Doaza passed just southeast of Juan de Nova Island. On the next day, the storm attained tropical cyclone status, reaching winds of 135 km/h (84 mph) just west of Europa Island. On January 30, the JTWC estimated peak 1 minute winds of 215 km/h (134 mph), by which time the storm was moving due southward. Doaza turned to the southeast and quickly weakened, dissipating within the westerlies on February 1.

While crossing Madagascar, Doaza dropped a maximum of 113.9 mm (4.48 in) of rainfall over 24 hours, as well as producing a peak wind gust of 60 km/h (37 mph). The storm brushed the east coast of Mozambique, producing flooding rains in Sofala, Zambezia, and Cabo Delgado provinces. It was the first major rainfall of the season for the country, helping offset a major drought. Passing near Juan de Nova Island, Doaza produced sustained winds of 76 km/h (47 mph) with gusts to 96 km/h (60 mph). Later, it brushed Europa Island with sustained winds of 83 km/h (52 mph) and gusts of 133 km/h (83 mph).

=== Tropical Cyclone Gwenda–Ezenina ===
- Tropical cyclone (MFR)
- Category 2 tropical cyclone (SSHWS)
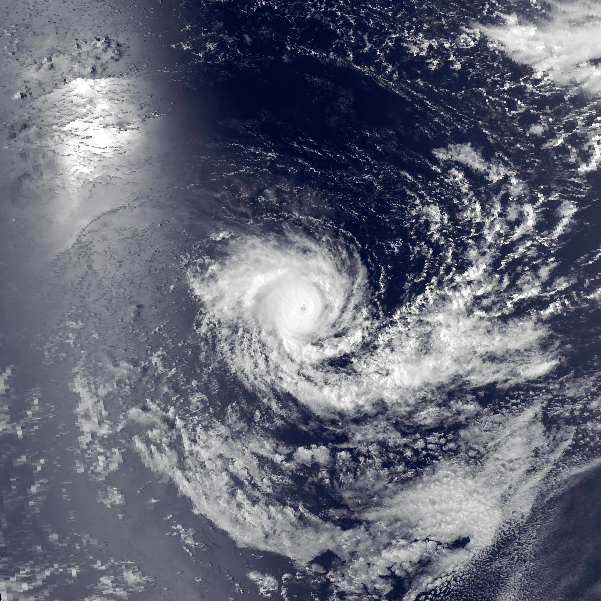
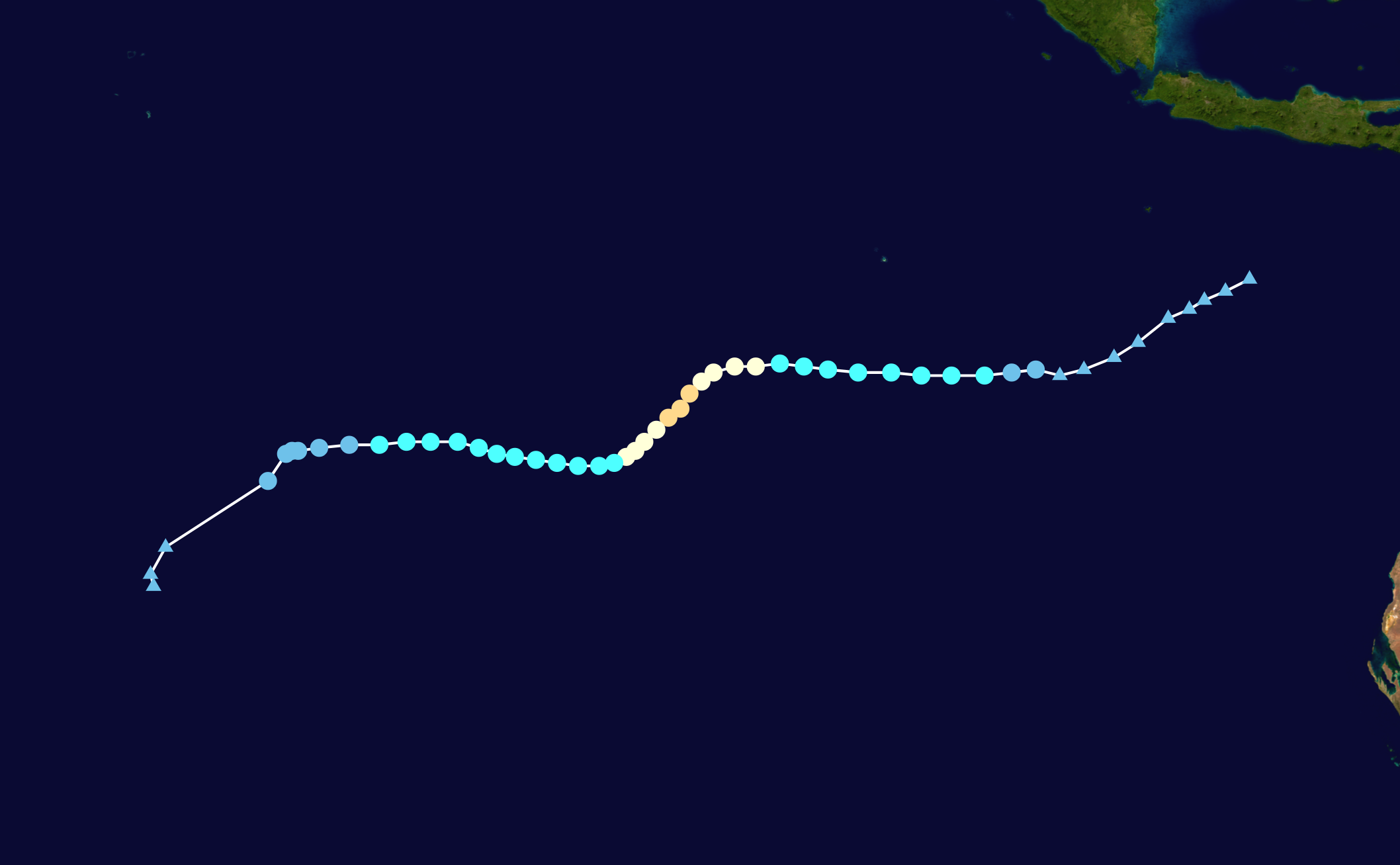
- Duration: February 12 (Entered basin) – February 18
- Peak intensity: 155 km/h (100 mph) (10-min); 941 hPa (mbar)

On February 6, a tropical disturbance formed in the Australian region from the monsoon trough. Given the name Gwenda by the BoM, it moved west-southwestward initially, gradually intensifying as it curved more to the west. On February 11, the storm turned to the southwest, and the next day crossed 90° E into the south-west Indian Ocean. At that time, the storm was renamed Ezenina, and it had reached peak winds of 150 km/h (93 mph). The JTWC also estimated peak 1 minute winds of 165 km/h (103 mph) on February 12. A ridge to the south turned Ezenina back to the west. Gradually weakening after its peak intensity, the storm fell below tropical cyclone intensity on February 13, and two days later the storm weakened to tropical depression status. On February 16, the JTWC discontinued advisories, as the weak system turned to the southwest. Ezenina dissipated on February 18 well to the south of Diego Garcia.

=== Tropical Cyclone Filao ===
- Tropical cyclone (MFR)
- Category 2 tropical cyclone (SSHWS)
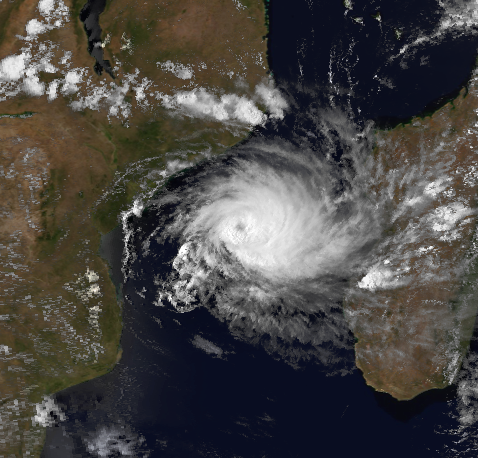
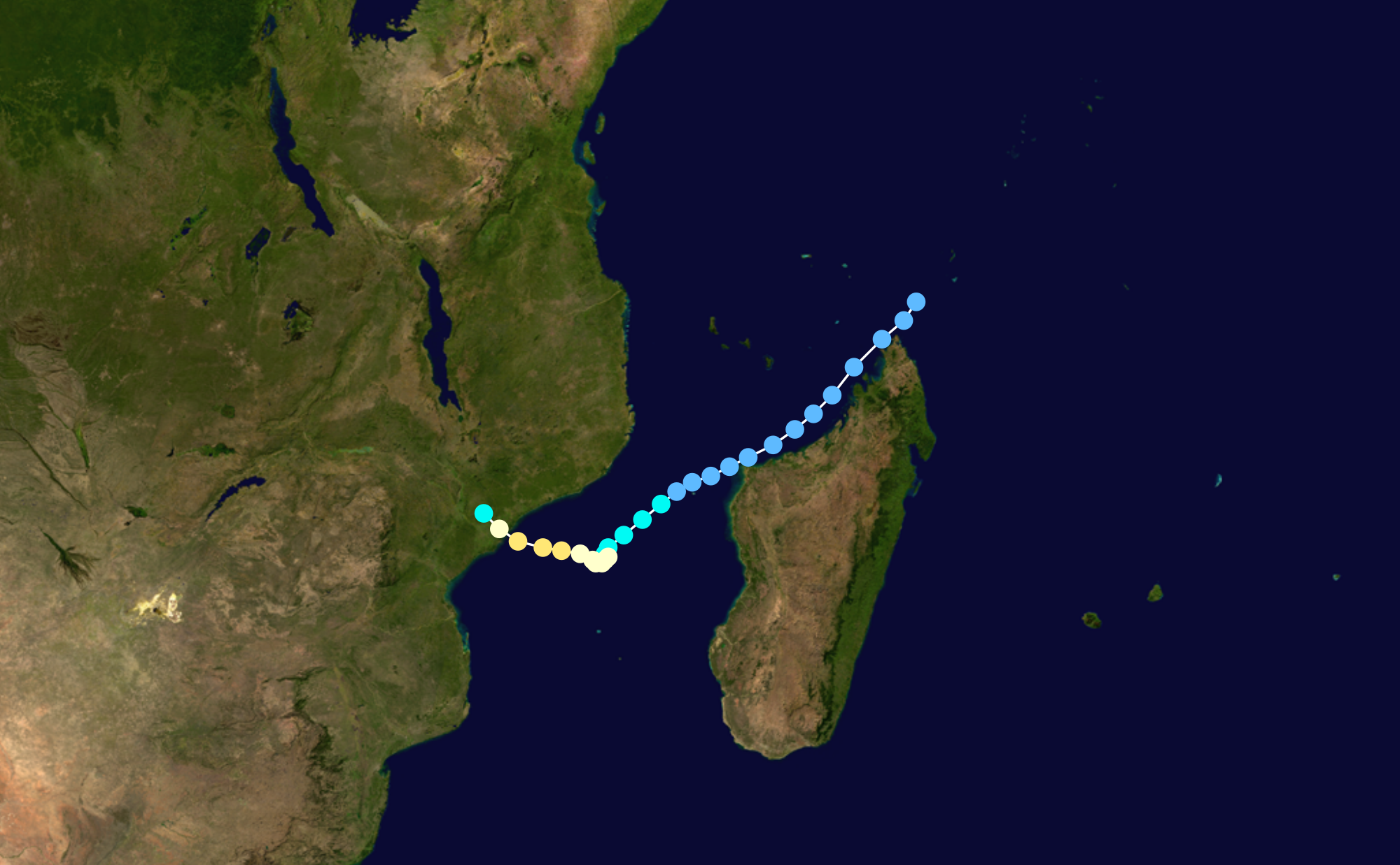
- Duration: February 23 – March 2
- Peak intensity: 140 km/h (85 mph) (10-min); 954 hPa (mbar)

A circulation appeared within the ITCZ on February 23 just northeast of the northern tip of Madagascar, designated as a tropical disturbance that day. It moved southwestward, moving over northwestern Madagascar as a tropical depression before emerging into the Mozambique Channel on February 25. The center was disrupted over land, although it gradually organized. On February 27, the system intensified into a tropical storm and was named Filao; on the same day, the JTWC began tracking it as Tropical Cyclone 14S. The storm stalled on February 29 due to a weakened ridge, and on that day Filao attained tropical cyclone status while reaching peak winds of 135 km/h (84 mph). It began a steady west-northwest track the next day once the ridge restrengthened. Late on March 1, Filao made landfall just southwest of Quelimane, Mozambique at peak intensity, and it dissipated the next day.

Moving over Madagascar as a weak system, Filao caused little effects, although once in the Mozambique Channel, it produced wind gusts of 87 km/h (54 mph) along Juan de Nova island. In Mozambique, the cyclone killed about 100 people. Damage was heaviest in Quelimane, where wind gusts reached 105 km/h (65 mph) and rainfall totaled 104 mm (4.1 in). There, 57 people were killed and 7,375 were left homeless. Nationwide, damage totaled around $10 million (1988 USD), with 1,748 buildings destroyed and 14,395 ha (35,570 acres) of crops wrecked.

=== Intense Tropical Cyclone Gasitao ===
- Intense tropical cyclone (MFR)
- Category 4 tropical cyclone (SSHWS)
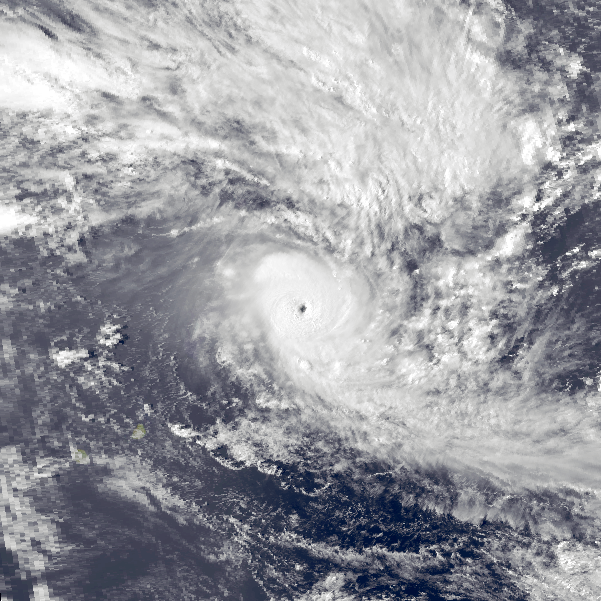
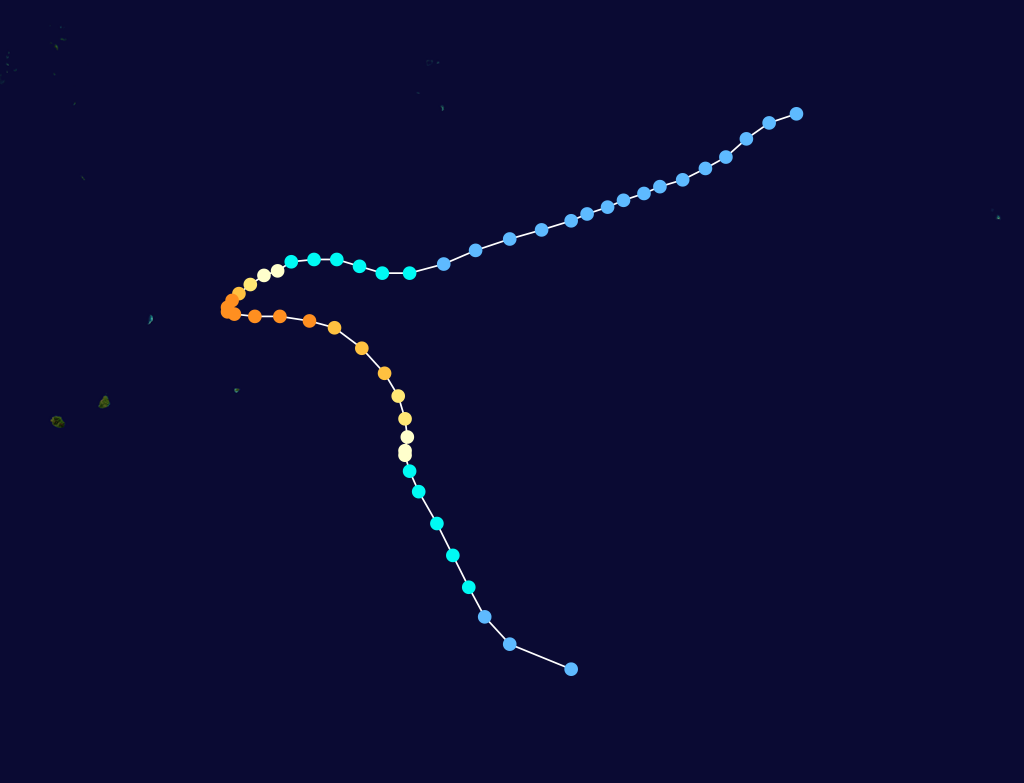
- Duration: March 15 – March 25
- Peak intensity: 165 km/h (105 mph) (10-min); 927 hPa (mbar)

Two circulations became evident in the central Indian Ocean in the middle of March, the westernmost which would become Tropical Storm Hely. The eastern one would become Tropical Cyclone Gasitao, which was first originating on March 12 to the east of Diego Garcia. On March 15, it developed into a tropical storm about 700 km (430 mi) to the south-southeast of Diego Garcia while moving on a west-southwest trajectory. On March 16, the Mauritius Meteorological Services named it Gasitao, the same day that the JTWC classified it as Tropical Cyclone 16S. By that time, the storm was moving more to the west as it gradually intensified.

On March 17, the JTWC upgraded Gasitao to the equivalent of a minimal hurricane. On the next day, the MFR upgraded it to tropical cyclone status as the storm slowed and turned to the south and east. The cyclone developed a well-defined eye during this time, surrounded by a powerful central dense overcast. On March 19, the JTWC estimated peak 1 minute winds of 240 km/h (150 mph) while the storm was passing 350 km (220 mi) northeast of Rodrigues. The MFR assessed that Gasitao reached winds of 150 km/h (93 mph) that day before weakening, although the cyclone restrengthened on March 20 to a peak of 170 km/h (110 mph). It accelerated southeastward while gradually weakening. On March 23, Gasitao became extratropical, and the remnants dissipated two days later as they were absorbed into the westerlies.

=== Severe Tropical Storm Hely ===
- Severe tropical storm (MFR)
- Category 1 tropical cyclone (SSHWS)
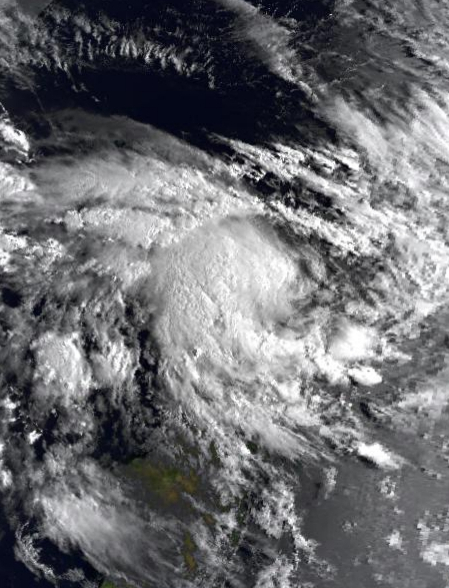
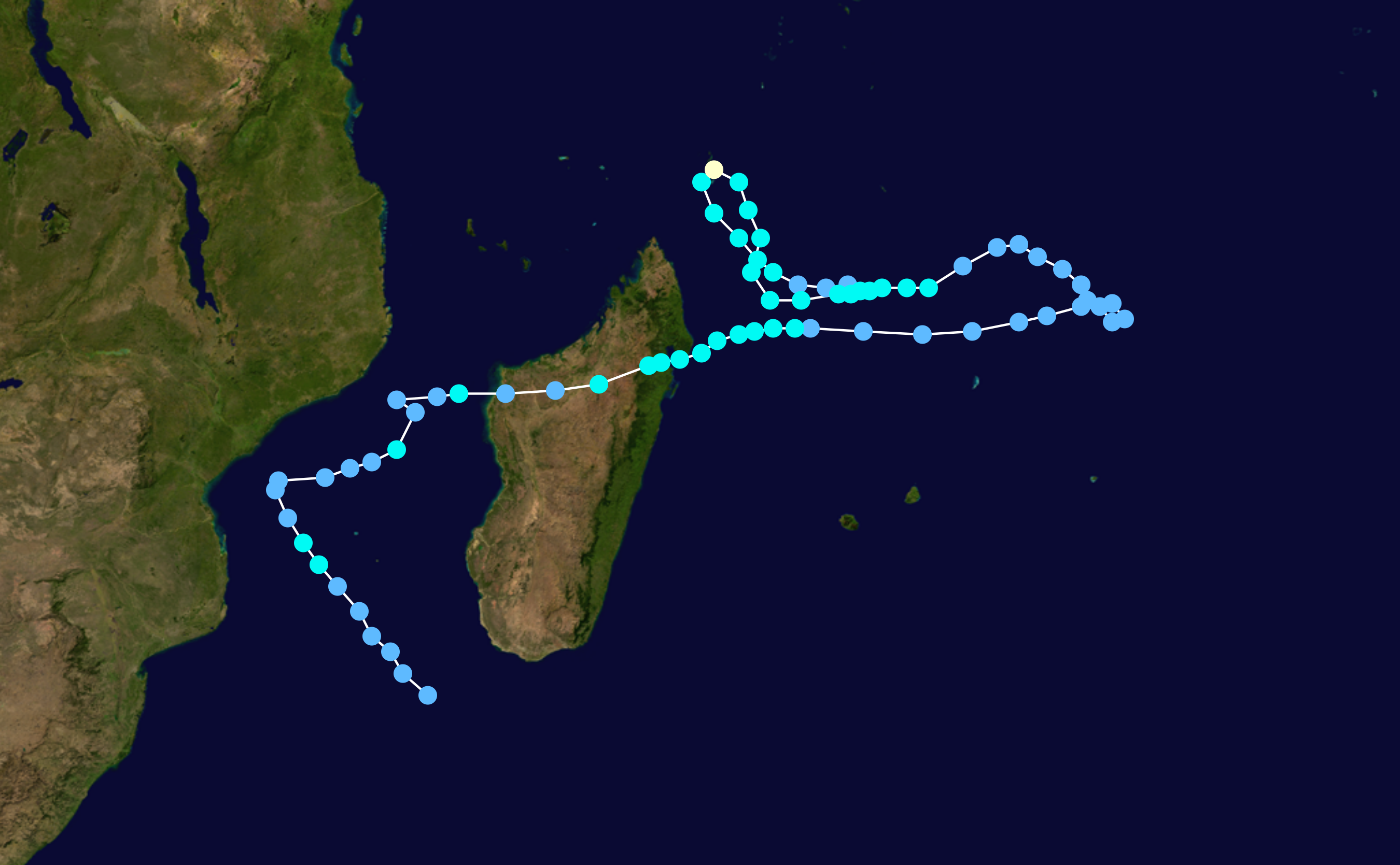
- Duration: March 16 – April 2
- Peak intensity: 95 km/h (60 mph) (10-min); 976 hPa (mbar)

Simultaneous to Gasitao developing, another low pressure area was forming to the north-northeast of Tromelin, classified as a tropical disturbance on March 16. Initially the system moved to the west and later northwest due to a ridge to the south. On March 17, the JTWC began tracking the system as Tropical Cyclone 17S, and the Meteorological Service of Madagascar named it Hely, despite the system only being a tropical depression. Soon after, Hely intensified to tropical storm status, reaching peak winds of 95 km/h (59 mph) early on March 18 about 200 km (120 mi) northeast of the northern tip of Madagascar. The ridge to the south briefly weakened, forcing Hely to the southeast and later east once the ridge restrengthened. The storm diminished in intensity, dropping to tropical depression status on March 20; on that day, the JTWC discontinued advisories.

The MFR continued tracking the circulation, and Hely turned back to the west on March 24 due to a strengthened ridge following Gasitao's dissipation. On the next day, it briefly re-intensified into a tropical storm, only to weaken to tropical depression status again on March 26. Moving toward Madagascar, Hely passed north of Tromelin and again became a tropical storm on March 27, the same day that the JTWC reissued advisories. Later that day, the storm made landfall just north of Île Sainte-Marie, and it weakened once again over land. Wind gusts in Madagascar reached 80 km/h (50 mph). On March 29, the storm emerged into the Mozambique Channel near Besalampy, and failed to re-intensify significantly as it moved southwestward. Two days later, Hely turned sharply to the southeast, sparing it moving ashore Mozambique. The MFR ceased tracking the system as a tropical cyclone on April 2, although the circulation was still visible as late as April 5, 21 days after it originated.

=== Moderate Tropical Storm Iarisena ===
- Moderate tropical storm (MFR)
- Tropical storm (SSHWS)
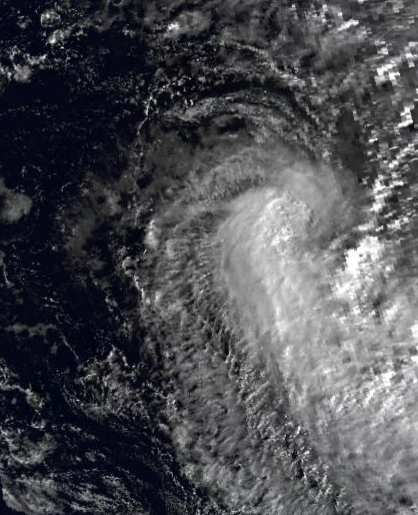
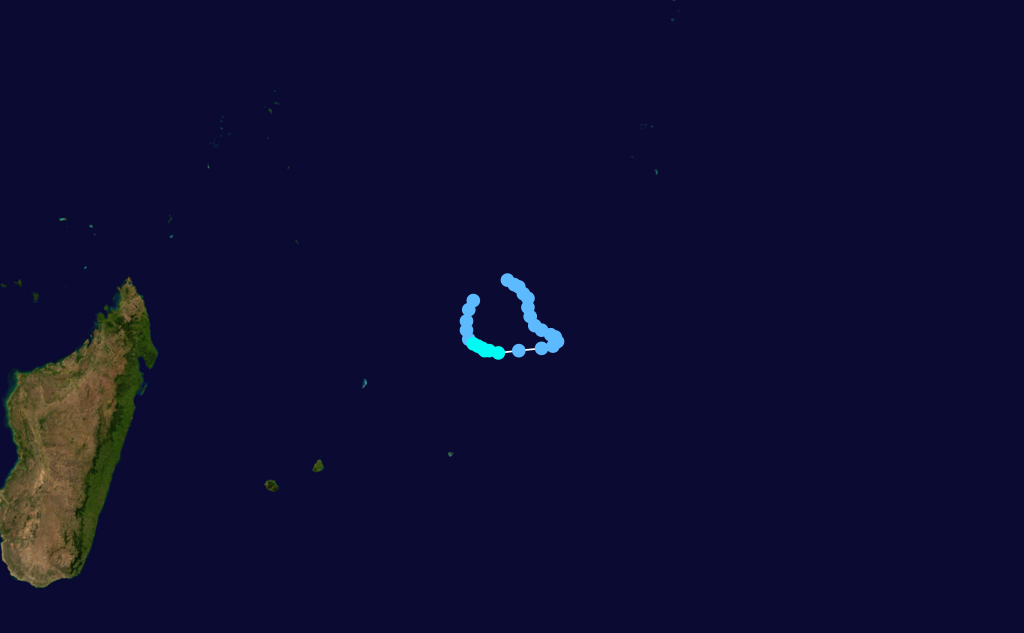
- Duration: May 6 – May 14
- Peak intensity: 65 km/h (40 mph) (10-min); 991 hPa (mbar)

After a period of inactivity lasting a month, the final storm of the season began forming on May 4 between Agalega and Diego Garcia. Two days later, the system developed into a tropical disturbance, although it initially consisted of just a circulation without any organized convection. It moved to the northwest at first before turning sharply to the south on May 7, slowly intensifying. On May 9, the system intensified into a moderate tropical storm with peak 10 minute winds of 65 km/h (40 mph). That day, the Mauritius Meteorological Services named it Iarisena, and the JTWC classified it as Tropical Cyclone 20S. A cold front steered the storm to the southeast. On May 10, Iarisena lost what little organized convection it had, leaving behind an exposed circulation as it weakened to tropical depression status. Thunderstorms briefly rebounded on the next day before diminishing again. The circulation became difficult to locate within the broad area of thunderstorms. It turned back to the north and dissipated on May 14, about 700 km (430 mi) southeast of where it formed.

== See also ==
- Atlantic hurricane seasons: 1987, 1988
- Eastern Pacific hurricane seasons: 1987, 1988
- Western Pacific typhoon seasons: 1987, 1988
- North Indian Ocean cyclone seasons: 1987, 1988
