= 1987 North Indian Ocean cyclone season =

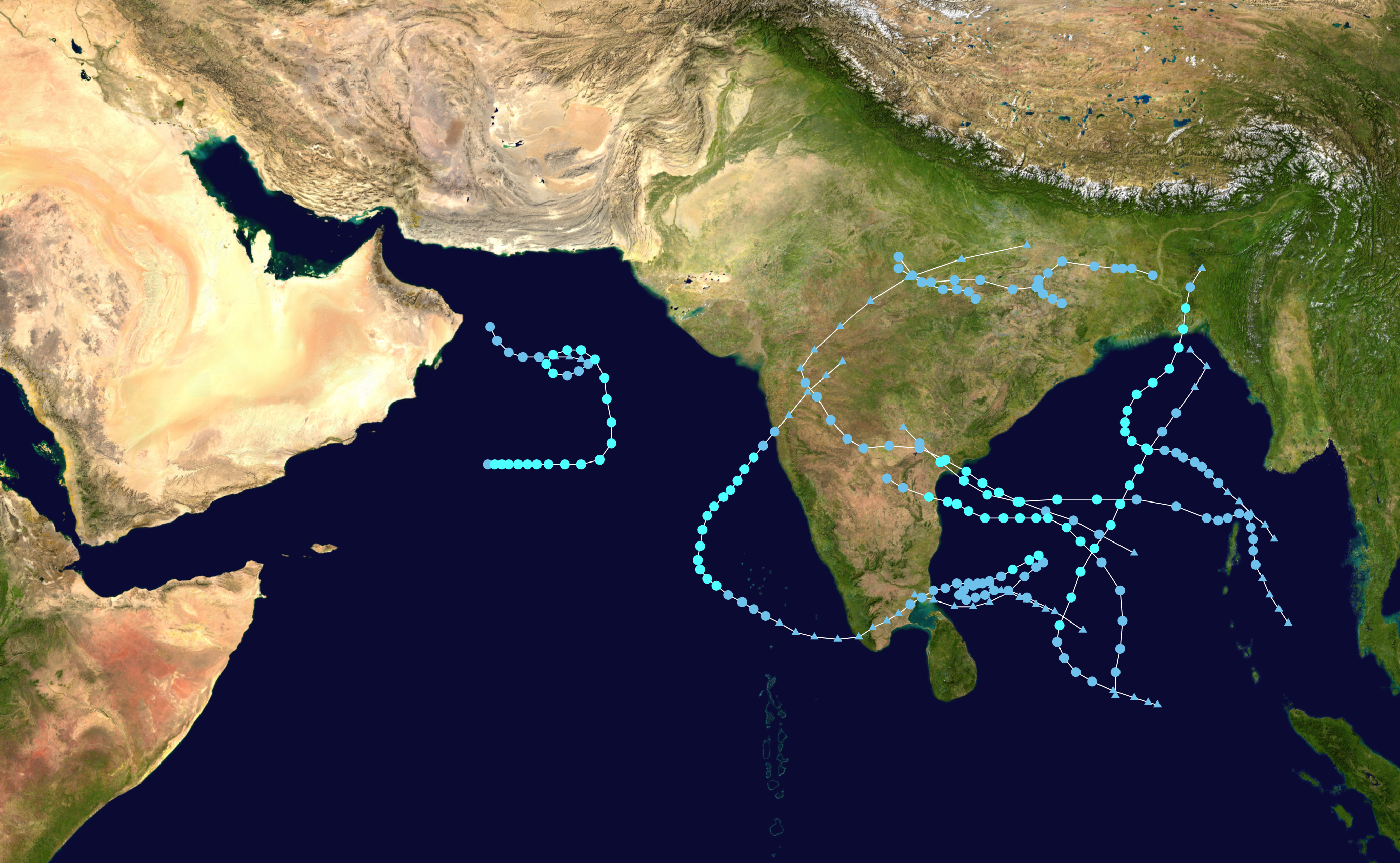
- Season summary map

Seasonal boundaries
- First system formed: January 30, 1987
- Last system dissipated: December 23, 1987

Strongest storm
- Name: BOB 01
  - Maximum winds: 140 km/h (85 mph) (3-minute sustained)
  - Lowest pressure: 970 hPa (mbar)

Seasonal statistics
- Depressions: 9, 2 unofficial
- Deep depressions: 6, 2 unofficial
- Cyclonic storms: 5, 2 unofficial
- Severe cyclonic storms: 3
- Very severe cyclonic storms: 1
- Total fatalities: >603
- Total damage: > $29.6 million (1987 USD)

Related articles
- 1987 Atlantic hurricane season; 1987 Pacific hurricane season; 1987 Pacific typhoon season

The 1987 North Indian Ocean cyclone season was an average season of tropical cyclone development in the northern Indian Ocean, featuring 5 cyclonic storms, along with two unofficial storms. Seasons have no official bounds, but cyclones tend to form between April and December, with the peak from May to November. These dates conventionally delimit the period of each year when most tropical cyclones form in the northern Indian Ocean. However, this season started unusually early with the formation of Very Severe Cyclonic Storm BOB 01 in January. Several storms caused severe damage across India and Bangladesh, leading to over 603 fatalities in total.

The scope of this article is limited to the Indian Ocean in the Northern Hemisphere, east of the Horn of Africa and west of the Malay Peninsula. There are two main seas in the North Indian Ocean—the Arabian Sea to the west of the Indian subcontinent, abbreviated ARB by the India Meteorological Department (IMD); and the Bay of Bengal to the east as BOB. The systems that form over land are abbreviated as LAND. The official Regional Specialized Meteorological Centre in this basin is the IMD, while the Joint Typhoon Warning Center (JTWC) releases unofficial advisories. On average, four to five cyclonic storms form in this basin every season.

== Systems ==
=== Very Severe Cyclonic Storm BOB 01 ===
- Very severe cyclonic storm (IMD)
- Tropical storm (SSHWS)
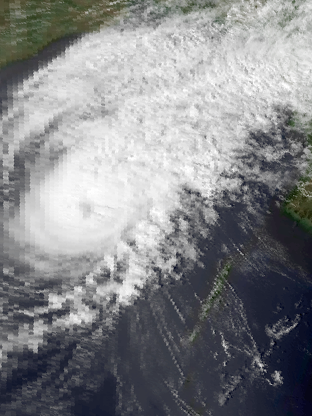
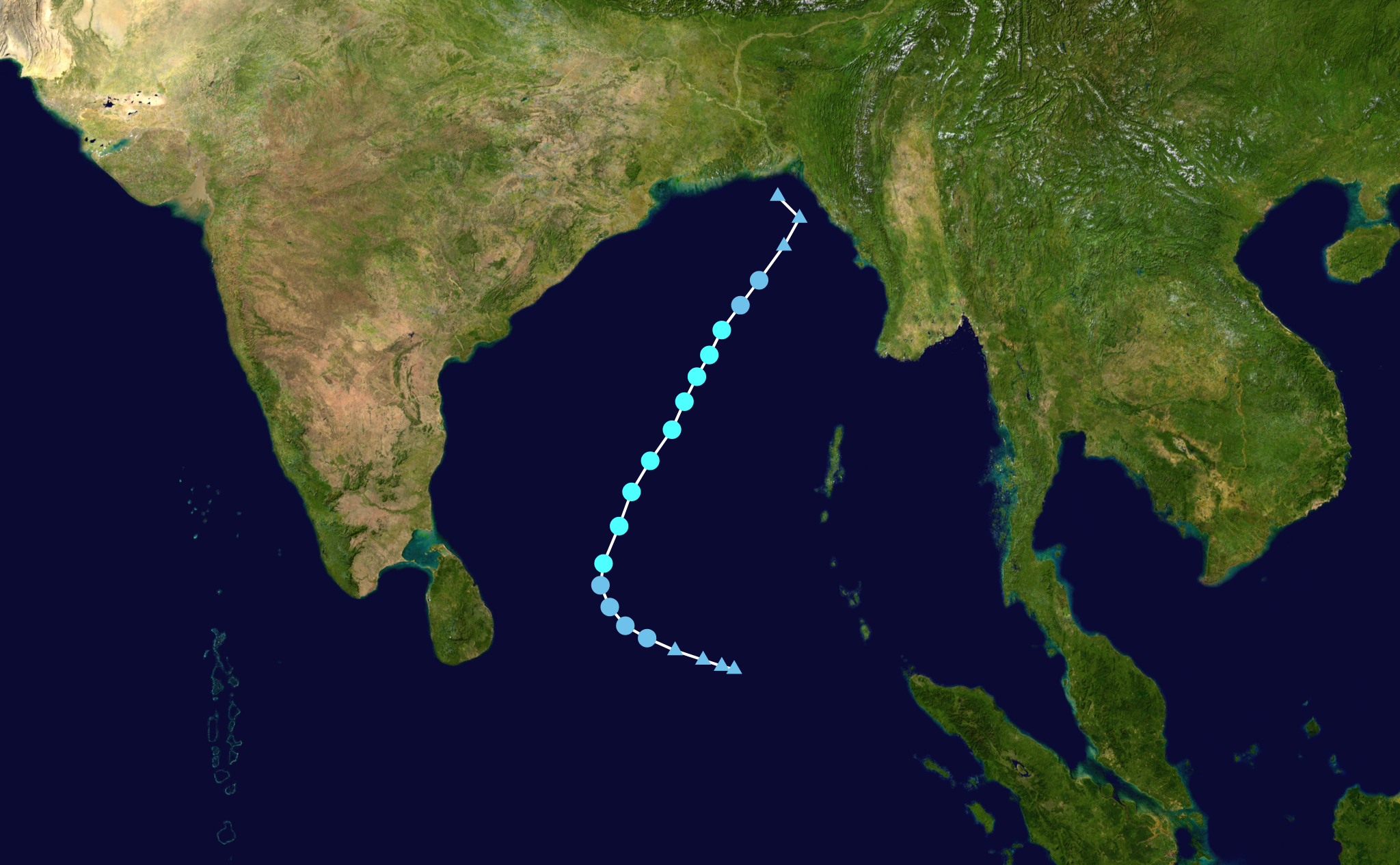
- Duration: January 30 – February 4
- Peak intensity: 140 km/h (85 mph) (3-min); 970 hPa (mbar)

A broad tropical disturbance was first noted on weather charts on January 29, while located 926 kilometres (500 nmi) to the east of Sri Lanka, and to the southeast of the Andaman and Nicobar Islands. Satellite imagery showed only a weak surface-level circulation, with little convective activity. The disturbance was located in sea surface temperatures of 28°C, and located in a low wind shear environment. The JTWC issued a Tropical Cyclone Formation Alert (TCFA) for the system on January 31, after convective banding increased over the storm. By this point, the IMD was already tracking the storm, which the agency had designated as Cyclonic Storm BOB 01. The following day, the JTWC issued the first warning on Tropical Storm 01B, though the IMD estimated the storm to be much stronger with winds of 140 km/h (85 mph) sustained over a 3 minute period, classifying the system as a very severe cyclonic storm on the modern IMD scale. This intensity was characterized by the development of an eye visible on satellite imagery. The cyclone would continue to intensify afterwards, with the IMD and JTWC both estimating that it reached its peak intensity on February 2, despite differences in reported intensity between the agencies. The following day, part of the storm's circulation became exposed as vertical wind shear increased over the cyclone, signifying that it had begun to weaken. Just six hours later, its circulation was fully exposed, and the JTWC issued their final warning on 01B/BOB 01 shortly after. After its dissipation, tracking data from the IMD and JTWC differs significantly. The former agency noted that the remnants of the cyclone drifted northward towards Bangladesh, dissipating before making landfall. Despite this, the JTWC reported that the remnants of the cyclone made landfall over Myanmar.

BOB 01 was a very unusual cyclone. It was one of only five cyclonic storms to develop in January from 1891 to 1988, and the strongest of them.

=== Cyclonic Storm BOB 02 ===
- Cyclonic storm (IMD)
- Tropical storm (SSHWS)
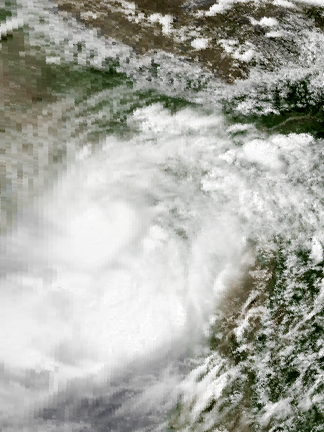
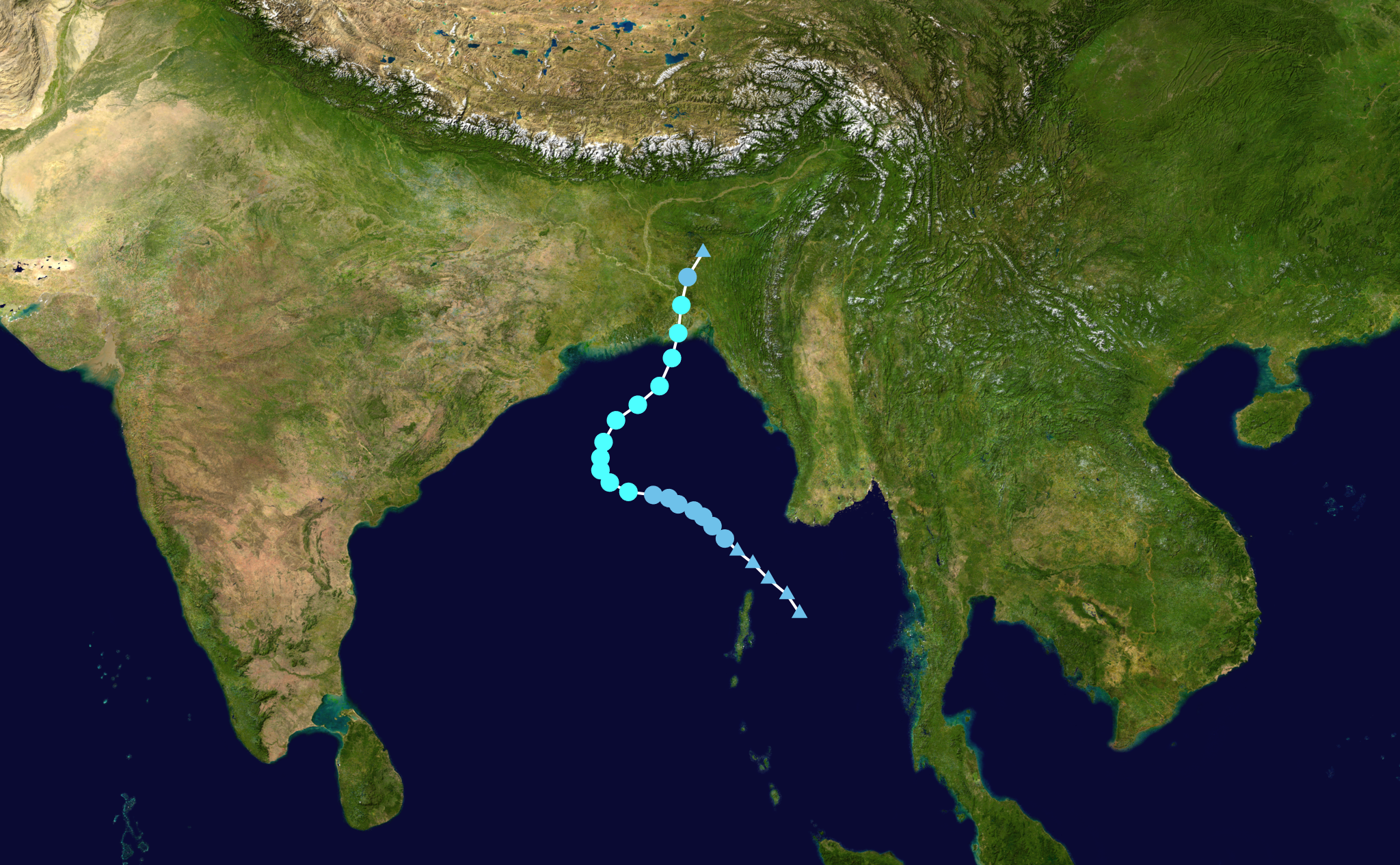
- Duration: May 30 – June 5
- Peak intensity: 85 km/h (50 mph) (3-min); 984 hPa (mbar)

The second cyclone of the year originated from an area of convection that was first located 407 kilometres (220 nmi) to the southwest of Yangon on May 30. The IMD began tracking the system on June 1, classifying it as a depression. After central convection flared over the storm's center, the JTWC issued a TCFA for the system on the same day. Further organization prompted the agency to issue the first warning on Tropical Cyclone 02B on June 2. At 1800Z the following day, BOB 02 reached cyclonic storm status per the IMD, as it continued to intensify as it moved towards land. Along with developing a ragged eye visible on satellite imagery, the cyclone reached its peak intensity on June 4, with the IMD estimating max 3-minute sustained winds of 85 km/h (50 mph) at 1200Z. Additionally, the agency estimated a minimum surface-level pressure of 984 mbar. The cyclone made landfall in Bangladesh immediately after, which led to the storm rapidly dissipating overland.

The cyclone crossed the regions of Hatiya, Sandwip, Patuakhali, and Bhola as a cyclonic storm accompanied by a tidal surge up to 6 feet (1.8 m) above normal, inundating low-lying islands. Heavy rain caused flash flooding across the country, though no loss of life was reported due to warnings prior to the cyclone's arrival. Despite this, the storm surge caused loss of cattle and other property, and flooded over 50,000 acres of farmland.

=== Depression LAND 01 ===
- Depression (IMD)
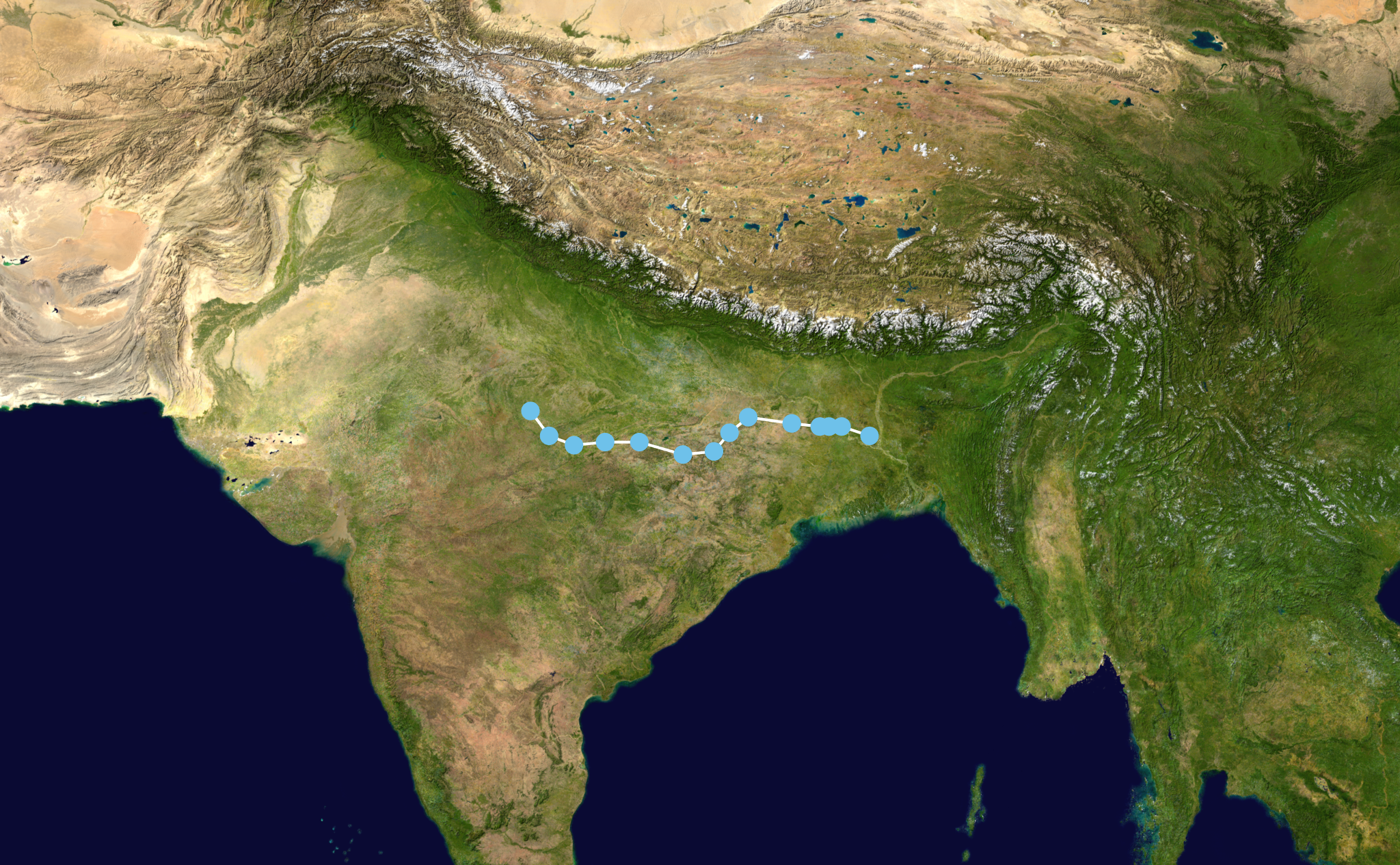
- Duration: August 26 – August 29
- Peak intensity: 45 km/h (30 mph) (3-min); 990 hPa (mbar)

On August 26, a land depression formed over central Bangladesh. The IMD estimated max 3-minute sustained winds of 45 km/h (30 mph), which it would sustain throughout its entire life. Additionally, the agency estimated a minimum surface-level pressure of 990 mbar. The depression was last noted on August 29, while located far inland over India.

Throughout August 27, the depression, despite being relatively weak, caused severe and deadly flooding across the Ganges Delta and other regions, effecting 51 districts in total. The flooding led to a large outbreak of diarrhea, with over 88,000 cases being confirmed across the effected regions. In response, over 1,600 medical teams were dispatched to emergency camps to tend to the sick or vulnerable. In total, $16.3 million USD in damages was dealt towards the medical industry, which was requested to be paid by foreign aid groups. Over 3.9 million acres of crops were either fully destroyed or partially damaged, and 700,000 houses were destroyed. In total, 484 fatalities were reported across the country, making the depression the deadliest storm of the year.

=== Depression LAND 02 ===
- Depression (IMD)
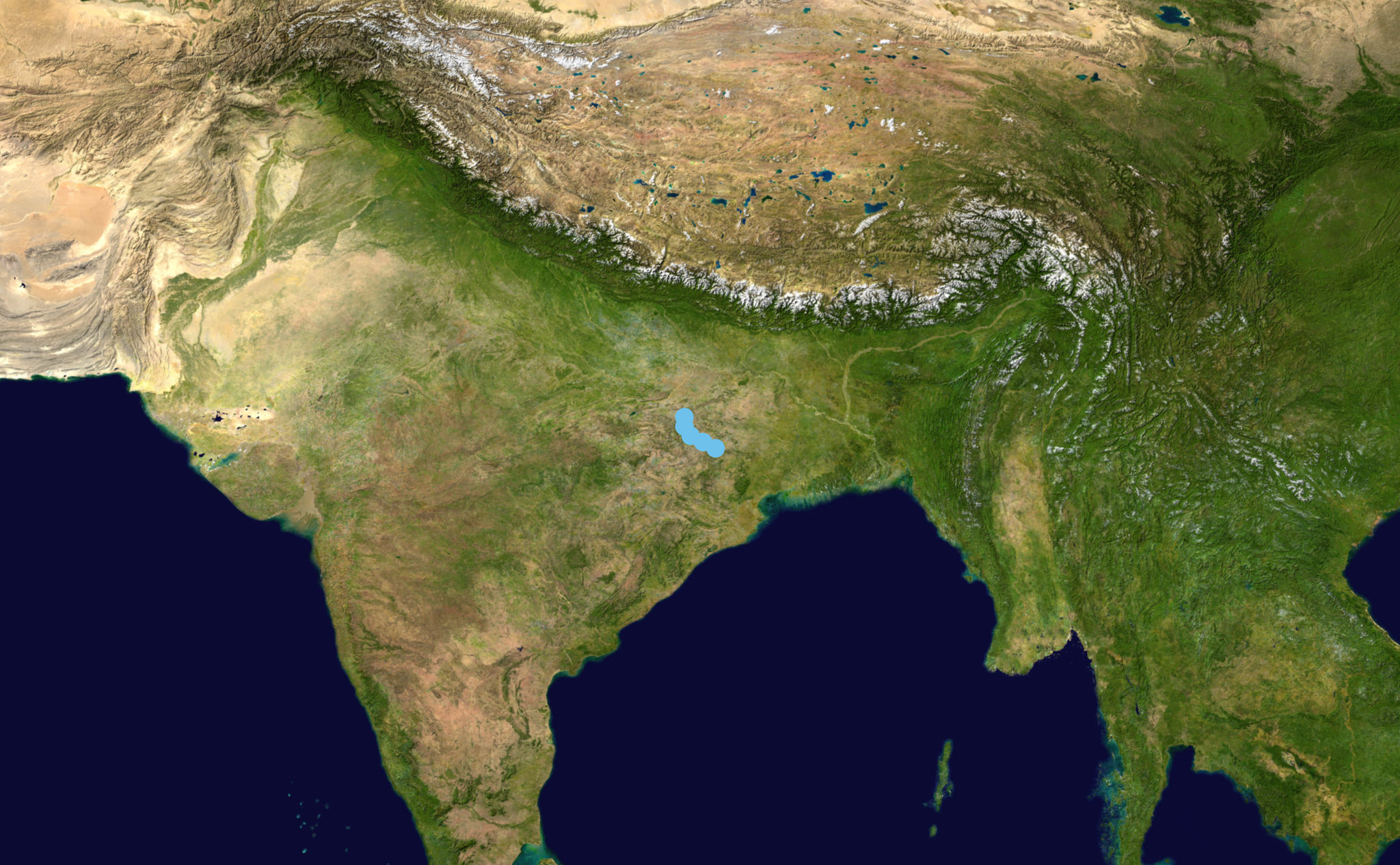
- Duration: September 11 – September 12
- Peak intensity: 45 km/h (30 mph) (3-min); 993 hPa (mbar)

=== Depression LAND 03 ===
- Depression (IMD)
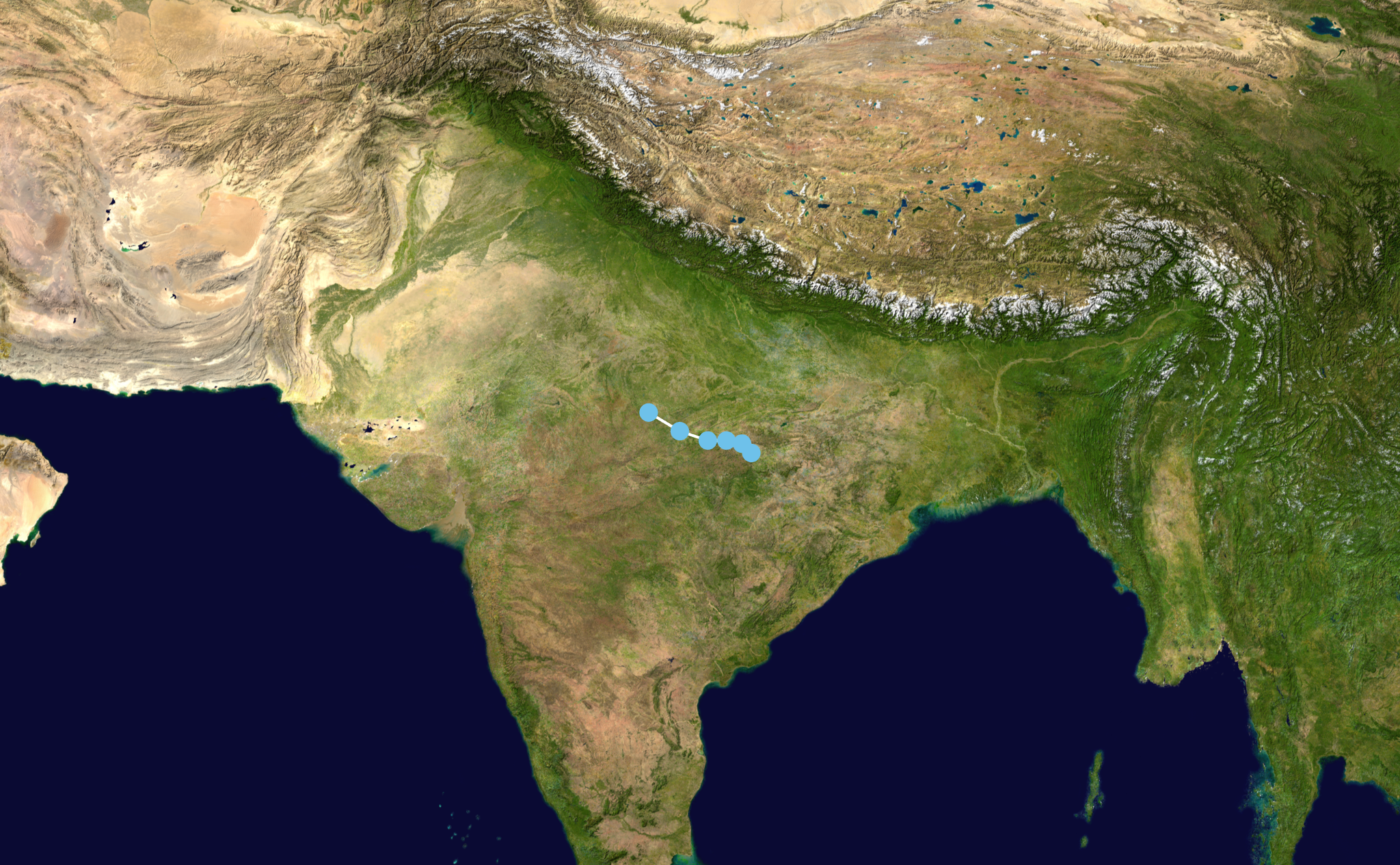
- Duration: September 15 – September 16
- Peak intensity: 45 km/h (30 mph) (3-min); 997 hPa (mbar)

=== Cyclonic Storm BOB 03 ===
- Cyclonic storm (IMD)
- Tropical storm (SSHWS)
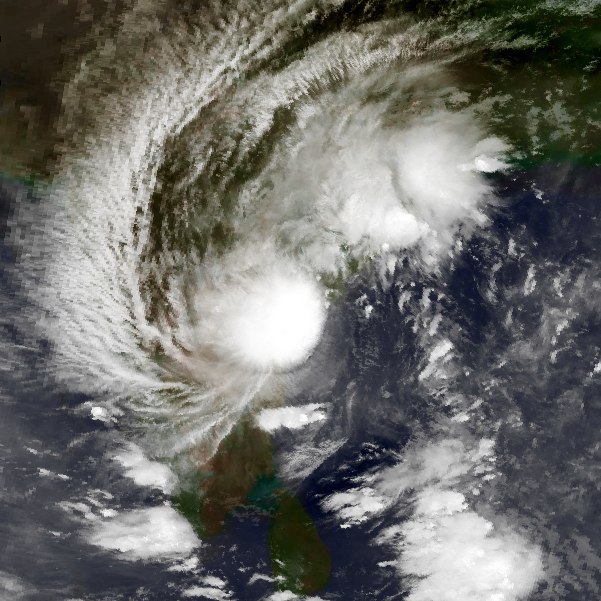
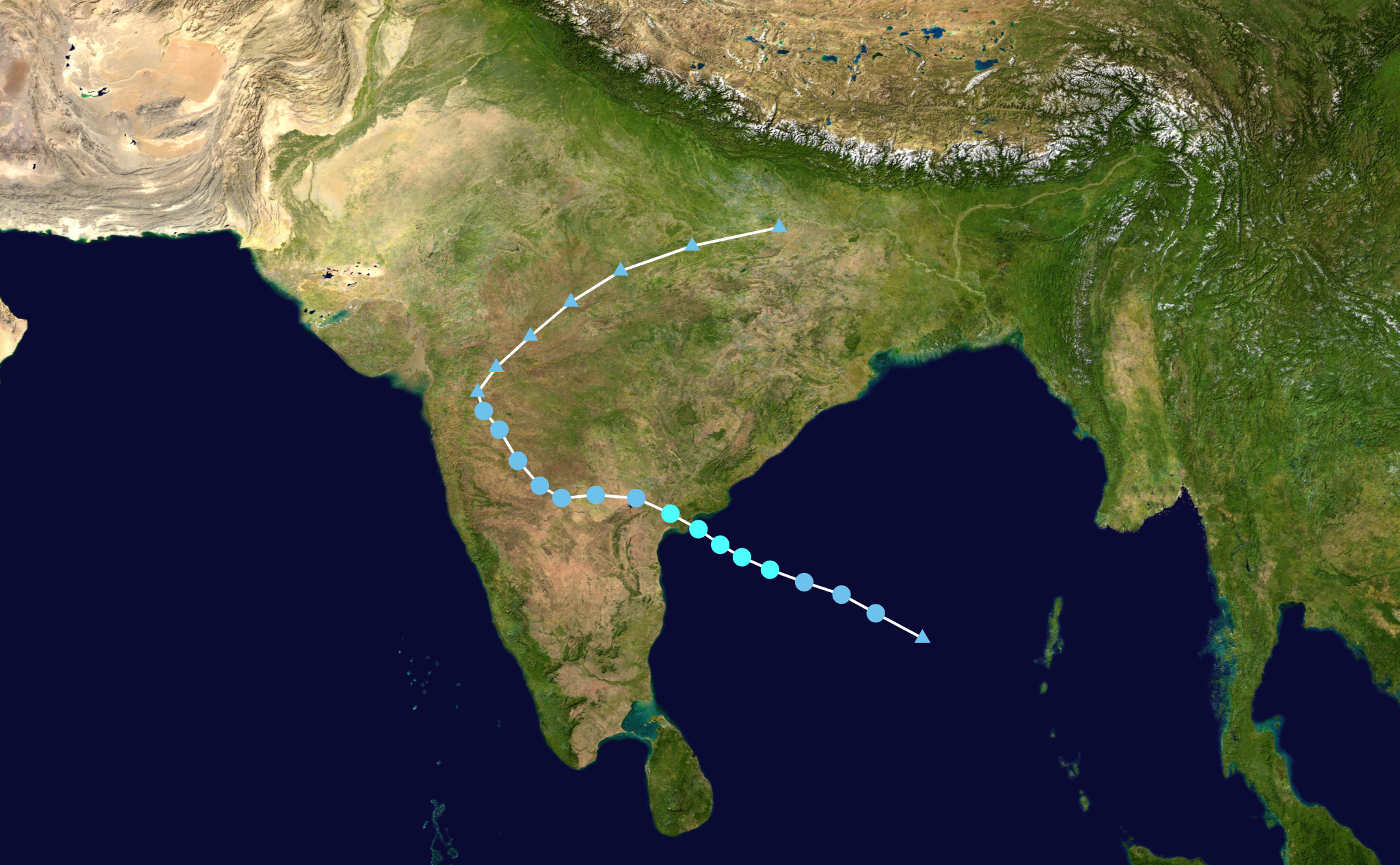
- Duration: October 14 – October 16
- Peak intensity: 85 km/h (50 mph) (3-min); 991 hPa (mbar)

No fatalities or severe damage were reported from this cyclone.

=== Severe Cyclonic Storm BOB 04 ===
- Severe cyclonic storm (IMD)
- Tropical storm (SSHWS)
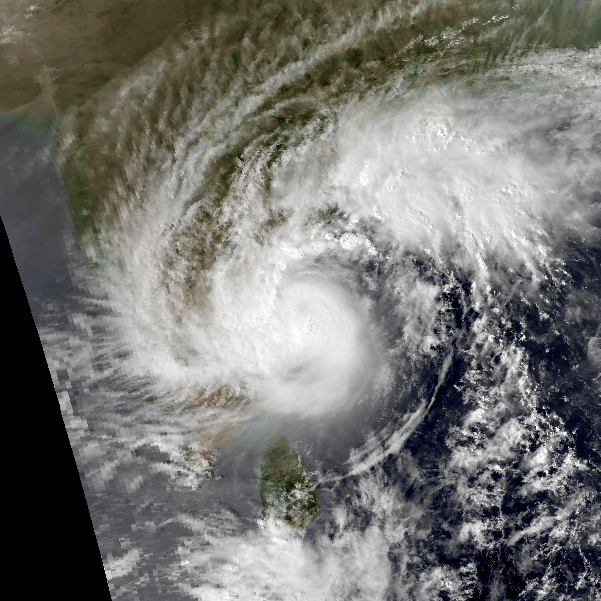
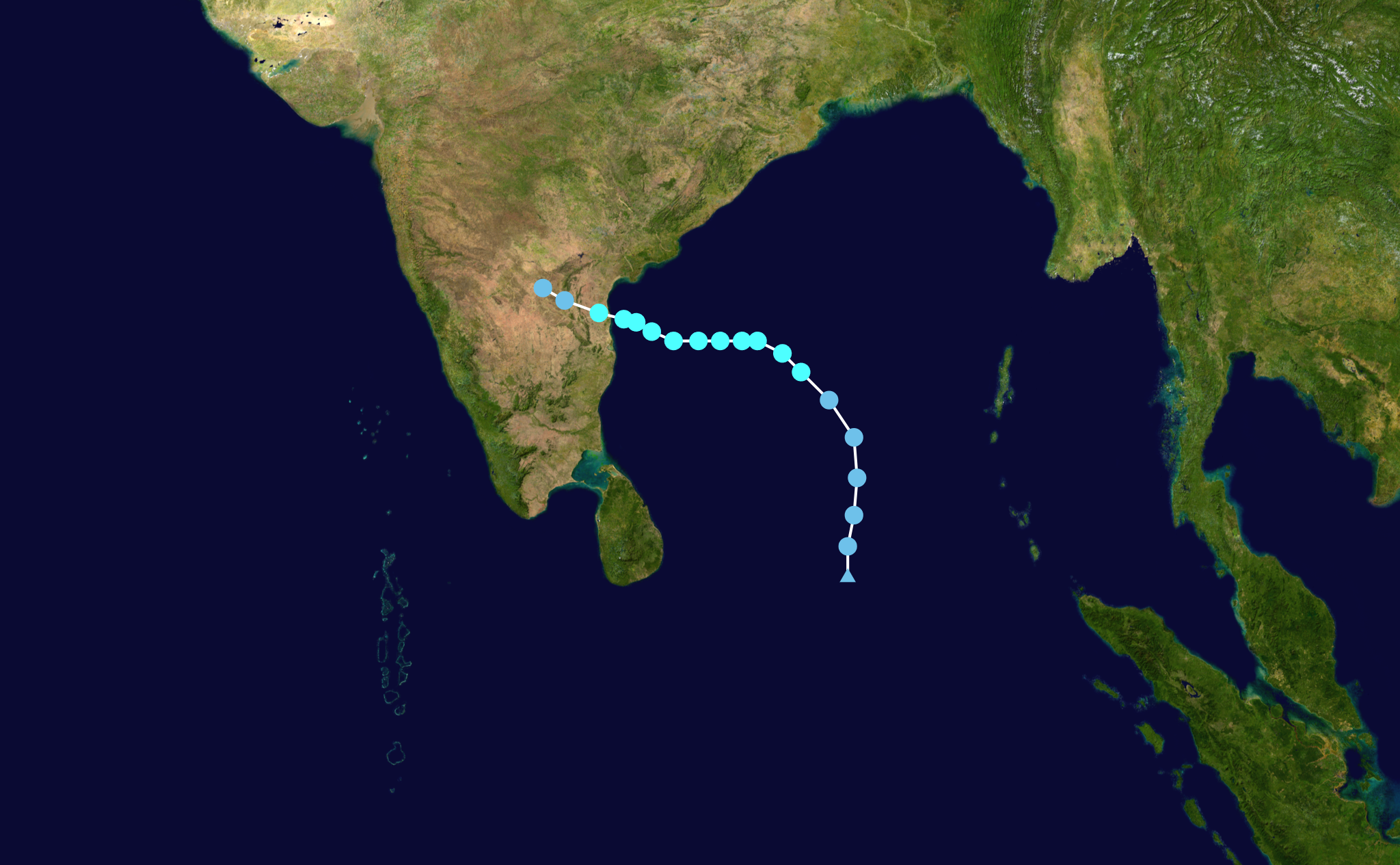
- Duration: October 30 – November 3
- Peak intensity: 100 km/h (65 mph) (3-min); 984 hPa (mbar)

The cyclone's impact in India was very severe. Over 100,000 houses were either damaged or destroyed, with 960,000 hectares suffering severe agricultural loss. Total damages were estimated at Rs126 million (US$13.3 million). The cyclone caused 119 fatalities in total.

=== Severe Cyclonic Storm BOB 05 ===
- Severe cyclonic storm (IMD)
- Tropical storm (SSHWS)
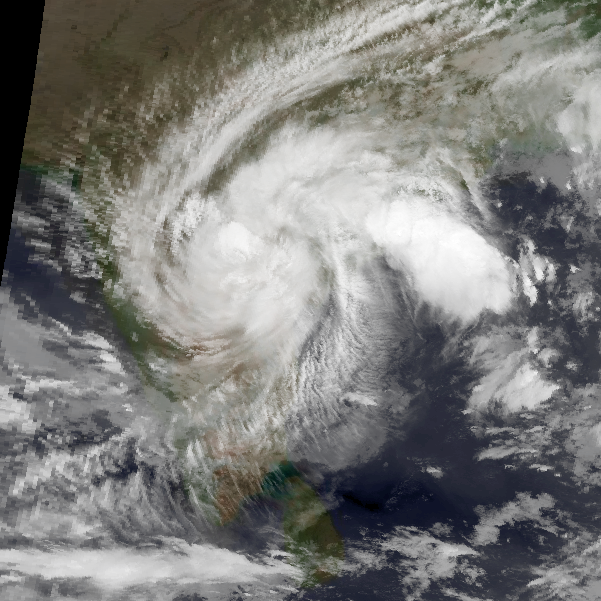
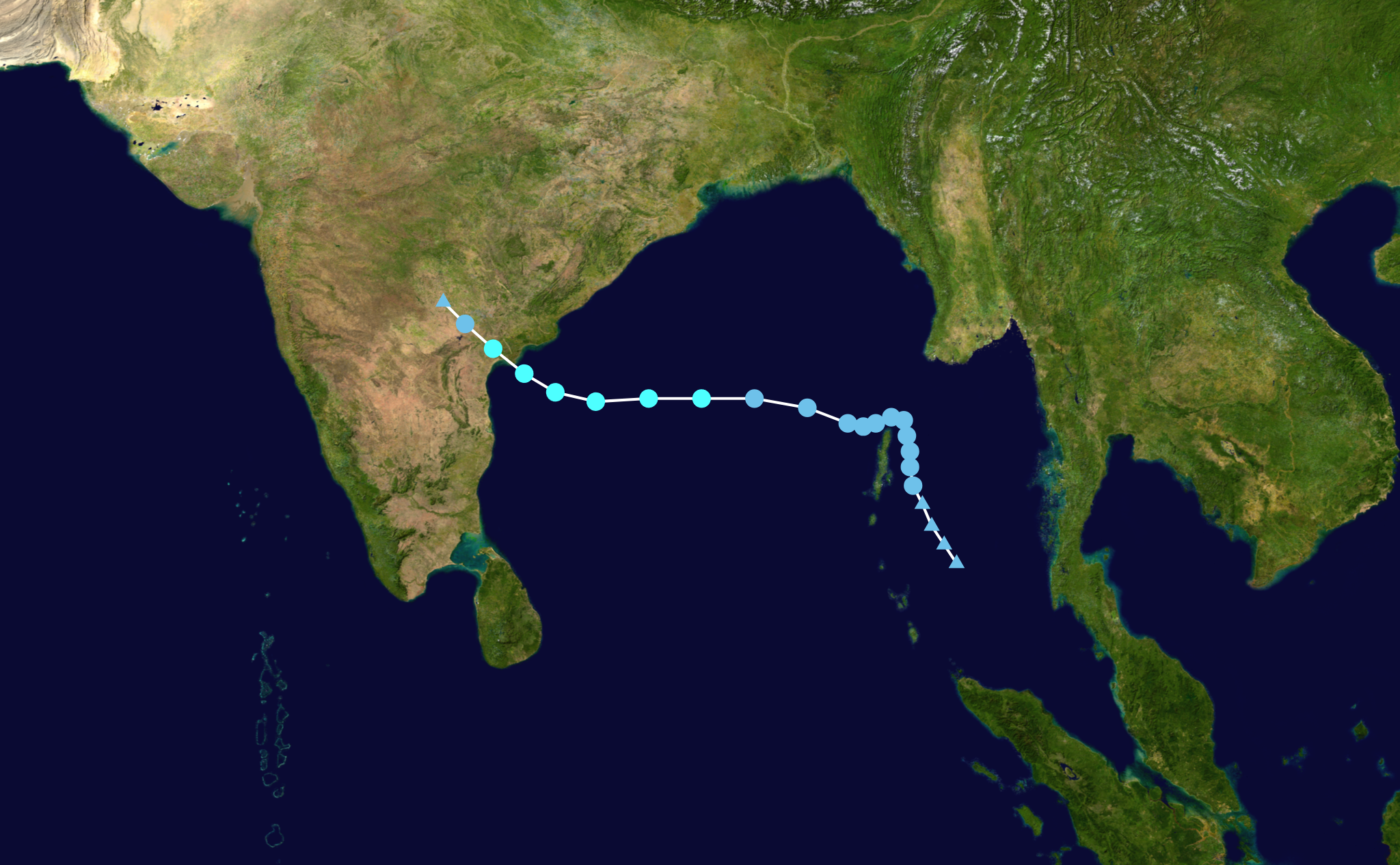
- Duration: November 8 – November 13
- Peak intensity: 100 km/h (65 mph) (3-min); 987 hPa (mbar)

The monsoon trough spawned a tropical depression on November 8 in the southeastern Bay of Bengal. It tracked northward, then turned westward, strengthening to a 60 mph tropical storm before hitting eastern India on the 12th.

=== Deep Depression BOB 06 ===
- Deep depression (IMD)
- Tropical storm (SSHWS)
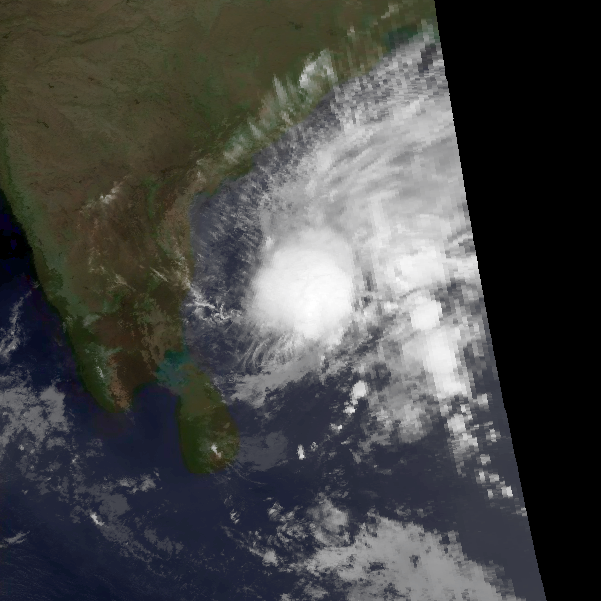
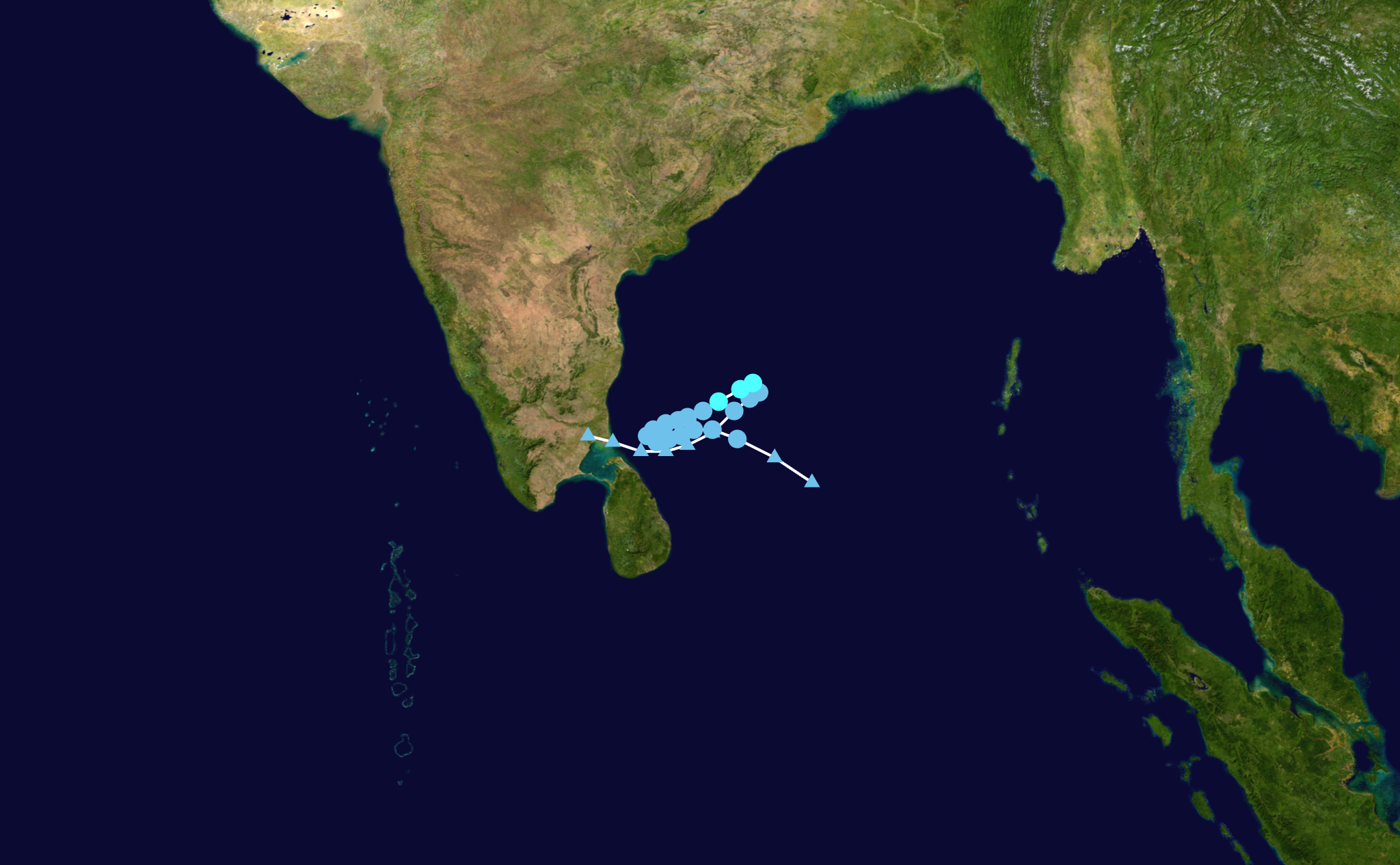
- Duration: December 17 – December 23
- Peak intensity: 55 km/h (35 mph) (3-min); 997 hPa (mbar)

The eighth and final storm of the season formed on December 17 northeast of Sri Lanka. It moved westward, and executed an elongated loop lasting 4 days. It briefly reached tropical storm strength before vertical shear weakened it again, and the system hit eastern India on the 23rd.

=== Other systems ===
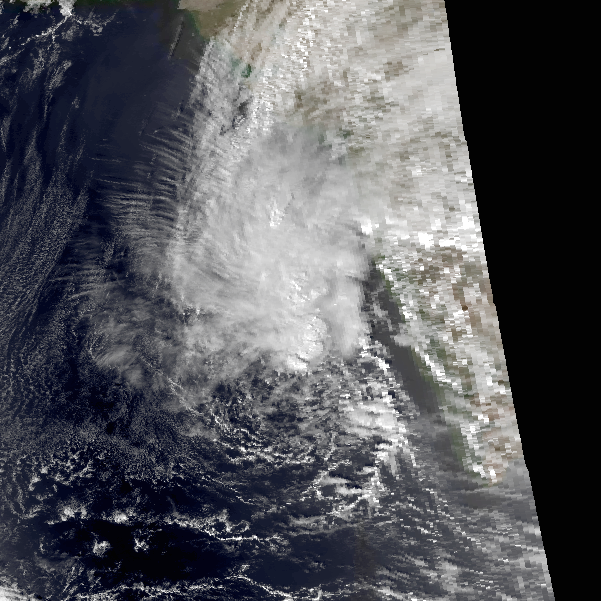
Tropical Cyclone 07A on December 10.

- A monsoon depression formed in the central Arabian Sea on June 4, and eventually the JTWC issued the first warning on Tropical Cyclone 03A on June 5, though post-analysis indicated it was classifiable as a tropical storm before this time. 03A reached peak 1-minute sustained winds of 95 km/h (60 mph) the next day. The final warning on the storm was issued on June 9, after wind shear bombarded the storm. Small amounts of convection persisted for two days after, though satellite imagery showed that it had completely dissipated by June 11 near the eastern coast of Oman. The storm was not tracked or warned upon by the IMD.
- An exposed low-level circulation formed in the Bay of Bengal on December 2, though operationally no agencies warned upon the system. Shortly after formation, it made landfall along the southeastern coast of India at tropical depression status. The weakened storm moved across land and into the Arabian Sea, prompting the JTWC to issue a Tropical Cyclone Formation Alert (TCFA) on December 8. Shortly after, the agency issued their first warning on Tropical Cyclone 07A after it reached tropical storm status on the Saffir–Simpson scale. This made the cyclone the first cyclone in the Arabian Sea in December since 1980. On December 10, 07A reached its maximum intensity, with 1-minute sustained winds of 80 km/h (50 mph). The cyclone began to slowly recurve towards the western coast of India afterwards, encountering strong wind shear that significantly weakened the system before it made landfall on December 12. No reports of damages or fatalities came from the storm, and it was not tracked by the IMD.

== See also ==
- North Indian Ocean tropical cyclone
- 1987 Atlantic hurricane season
- 1987 Pacific hurricane season
- 1987 Pacific typhoon season
- Australian cyclone seasons: 1986–87, 1987–88
- South Pacific cyclone seasons: 1986–87, 1987–88
- South-West Indian Ocean cyclone seasons: 1986–87, 1987–88
