= 1987–88 Australian region cyclone season =

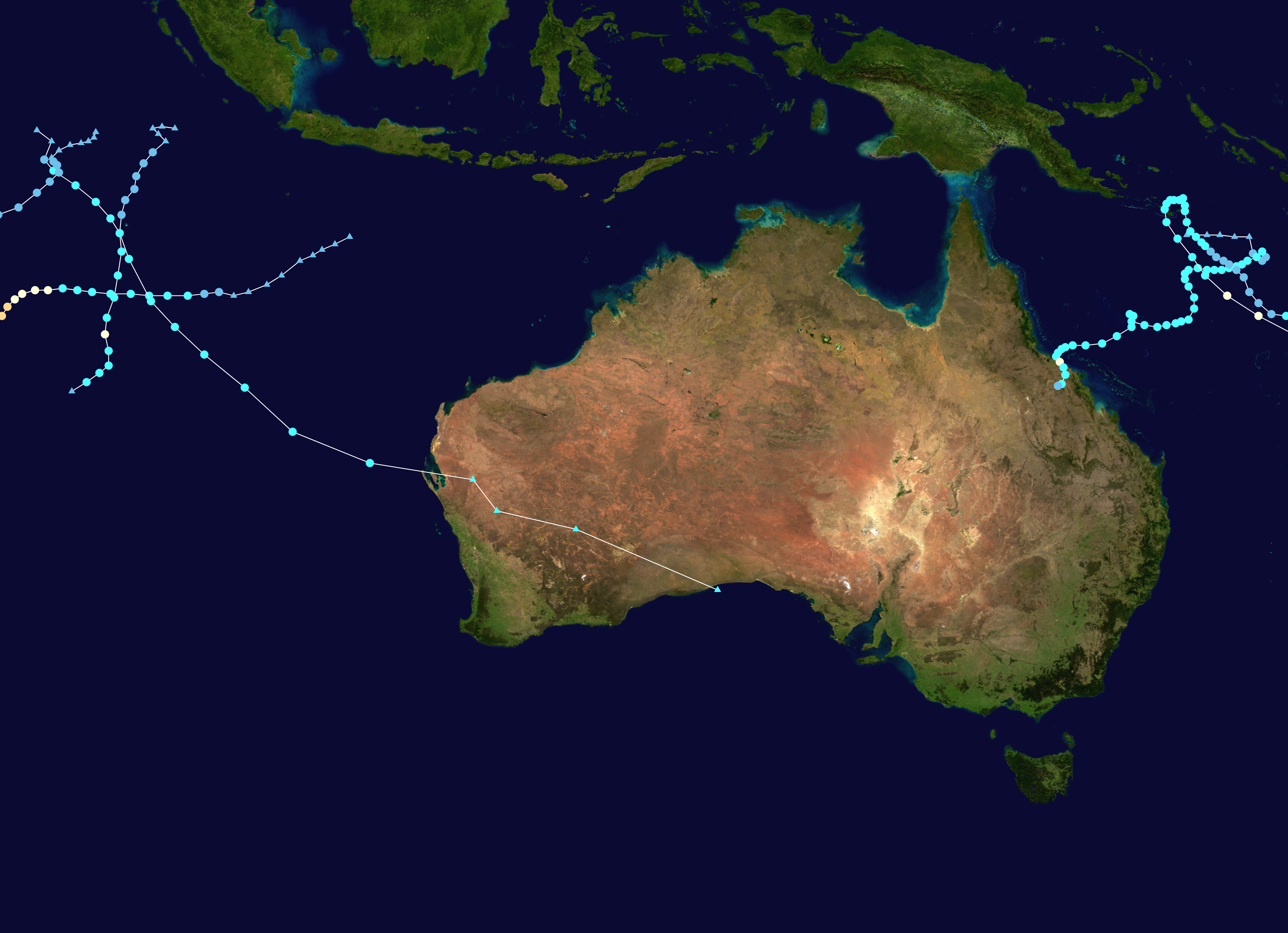
- Season summary map

Seasonal boundaries
- First system formed: 6 December 1987
- Last system dissipated: 20 May 1988

Strongest storm
- Name: Gwenda-Ezenina
  - Maximum winds: 185 km/h (115 mph) (10-minute sustained)
  - Lowest pressure: 940 hPa (mbar)

Seasonal statistics
- Tropical lows: 6 (record low)
- Tropical cyclones: 5
- Severe tropical cyclones: 3
- Total fatalities: 1
- Total damage: $17.9 million (1988 USD)

Related articles
- 1987–88 South-West Indian Ocean cyclone season; 1987–88 South Pacific cyclone season

The 1987–88 Australian region cyclone season was the one of least active Australian region tropical cyclone seasons on record. It officially started on 1 November 1987, and officially ended on 30 April 1988. The regional tropical cyclone operational plan defines a "tropical cyclone year" separately from a "tropical cyclone season"; the "tropical cyclone year" began on 1 July 1987 and ended on 30 June 1988.

== Systems ==
=== Tropical Low Ariny ===
- Tropical low (Australian scale)
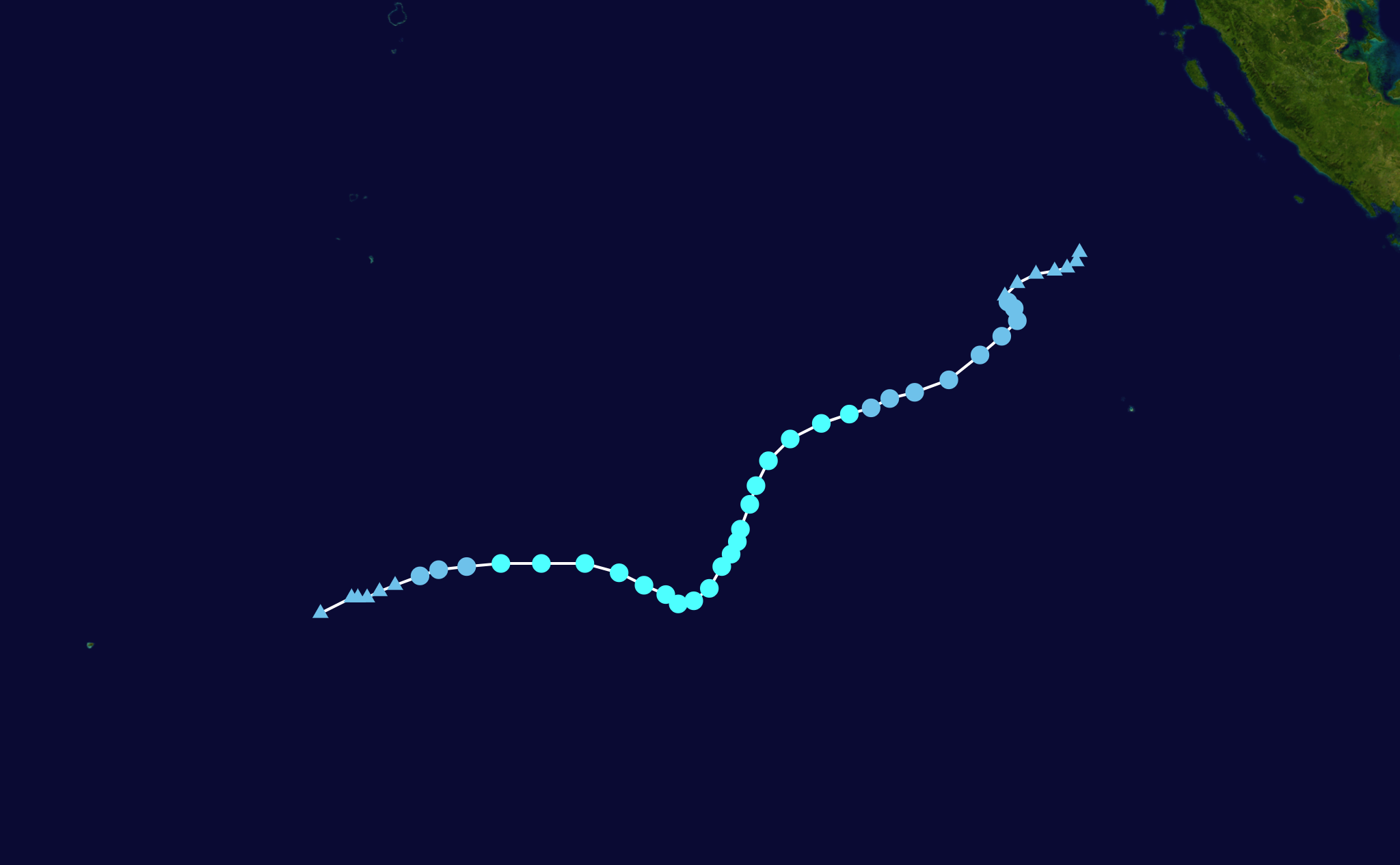
- Duration: 6 December – 9 December (Exited basin)
- Peak intensity: 55 km/h (35 mph) (10-min);

Ariny was a weak tropical cyclone and did not affect land.

=== Tropical Cyclone Agi ===
- Category 2 tropical cyclone (Australian scale)
- Category 1 tropical cyclone (SSHWS)
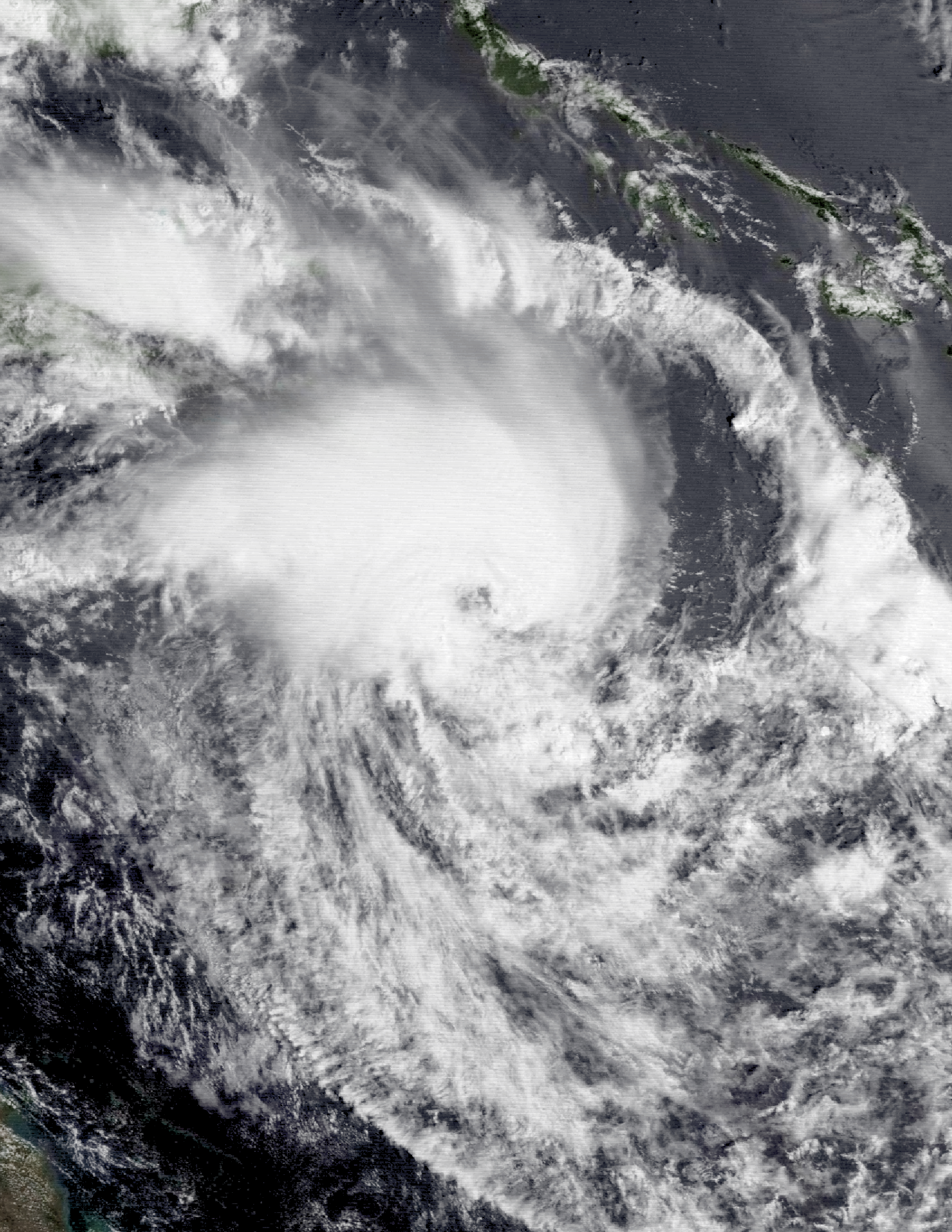
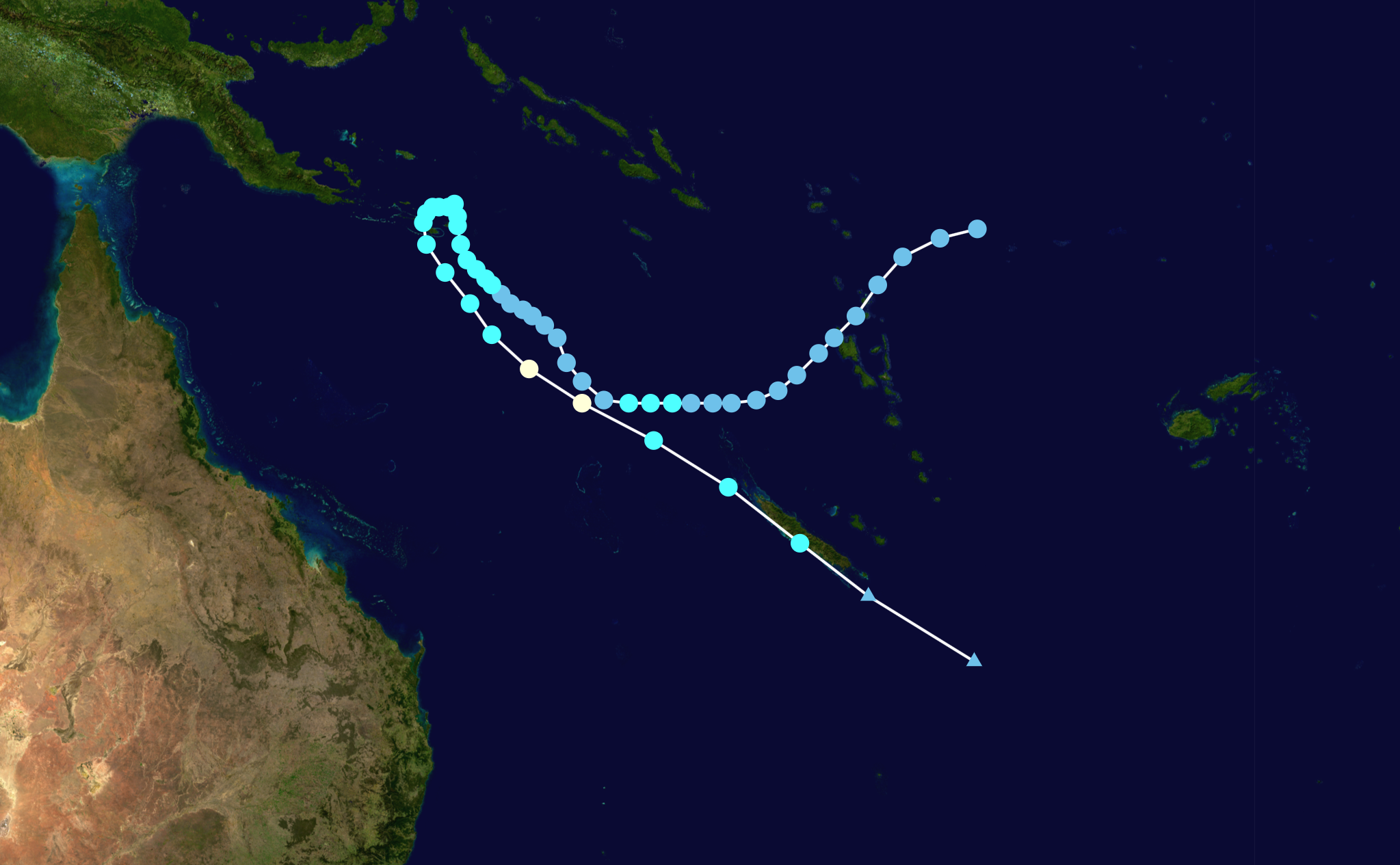
- Duration: 6 January (Entered basin) – 14 January (Exited basin)
- Peak intensity: 95 km/h (60 mph) (10-min); 980 hPa (mbar)

Cyclone Agi veered away from the main islands of Papua New Guinea's Milne Bay province after flattening many buildings, uprooting trees and disrupting water supplies. Agi brought heavy rain, high tides and winds gusting at more than 100 km/h to the remote islands it brushed at the eastern tip of the PNG mainland since it formed and began to swirl through the area on Sunday.

=== Severe Tropical Cyclone Frederic ===
- Category 3 severe tropical cyclone (Australian scale)
- Category 1 tropical cyclone (SSHWS)
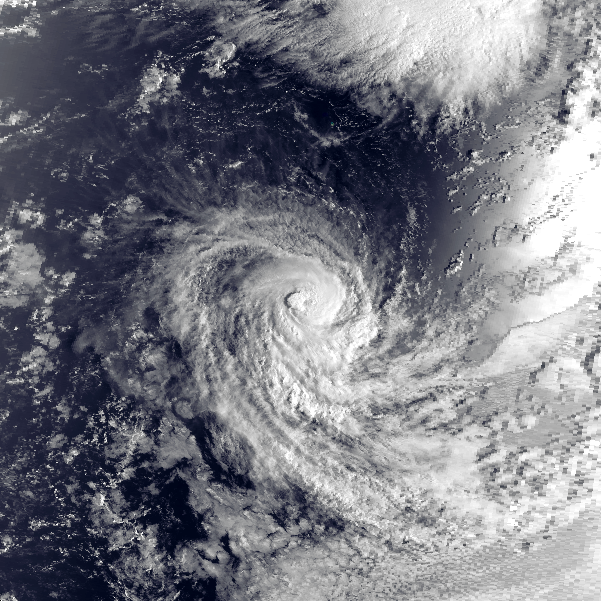
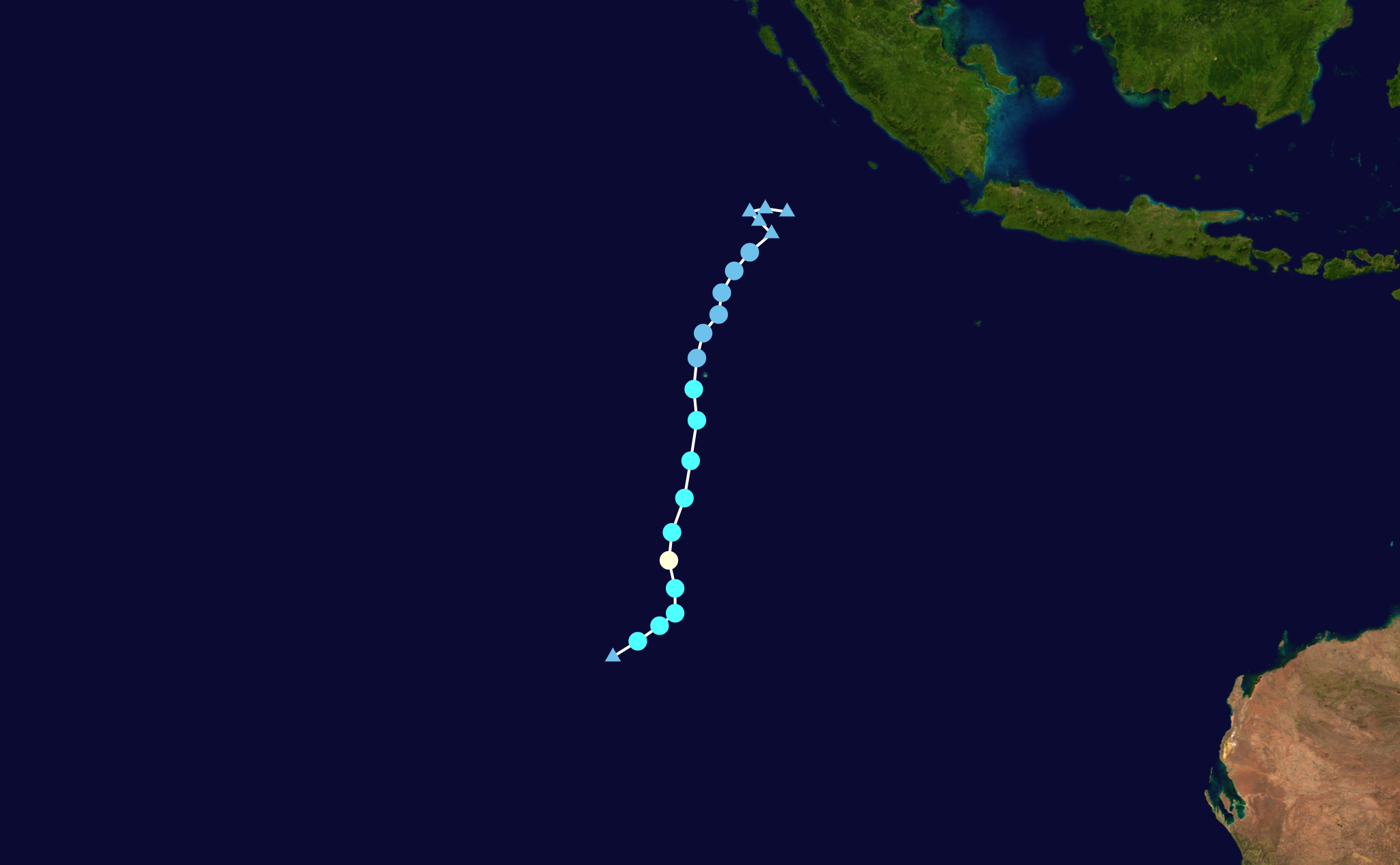
- Duration: 28 January – 2 February
- Peak intensity: 150 km/h (90 mph) (10-min); 955 hPa (mbar)

Frederic stayed at sea.

=== Severe Tropical Cyclone Gwenda-Ezenina ===
- Category 4 severe tropical cyclone (Australian scale)
- Category 2 tropical cyclone (SSHWS)
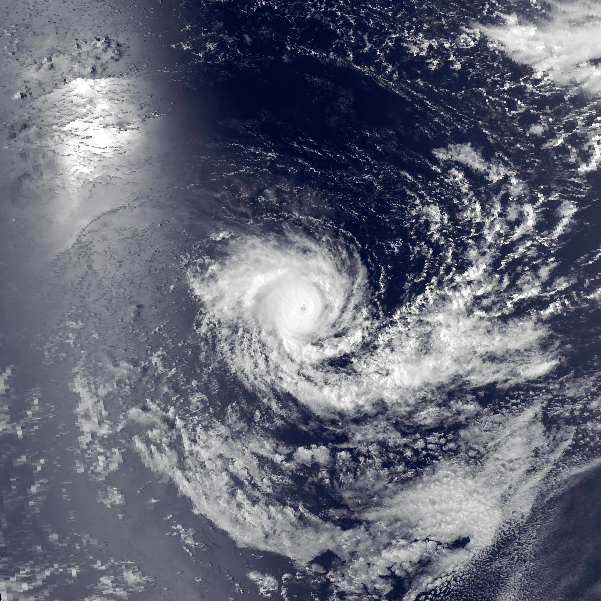
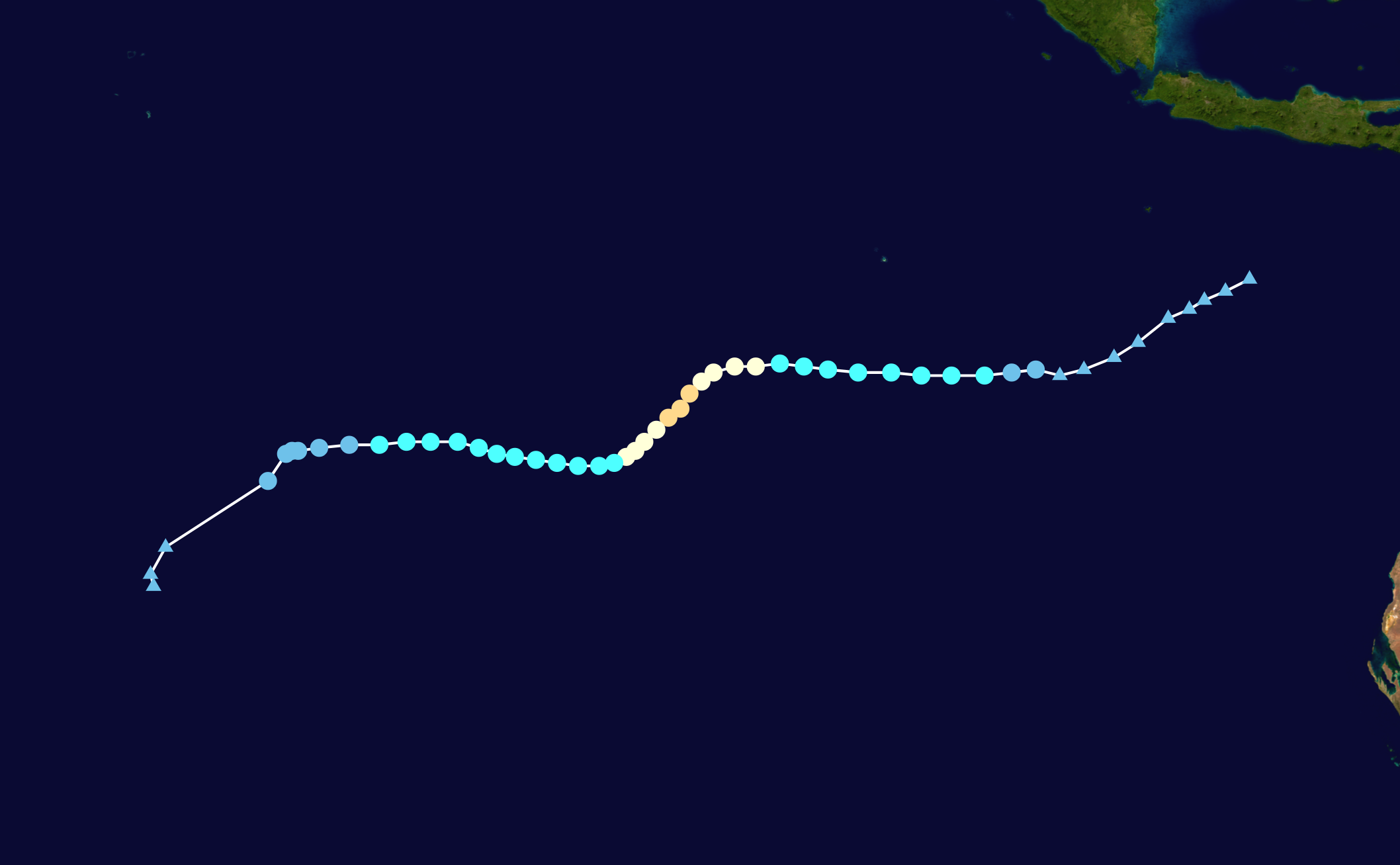
- Duration: 6 February – 12 February (Exited basin)
- Peak intensity: 185 km/h (115 mph) (10-min); 941 hPa (mbar)

Gwenda stayed at sea and entered the South-West Indian Ocean basin on 12 February and was renamed as Ezezina.

=== Severe Tropical Cyclone Charlie ===
- Category 3 severe tropical cyclone (Australian scale)
- Category 1 tropical cyclone (SSHWS)
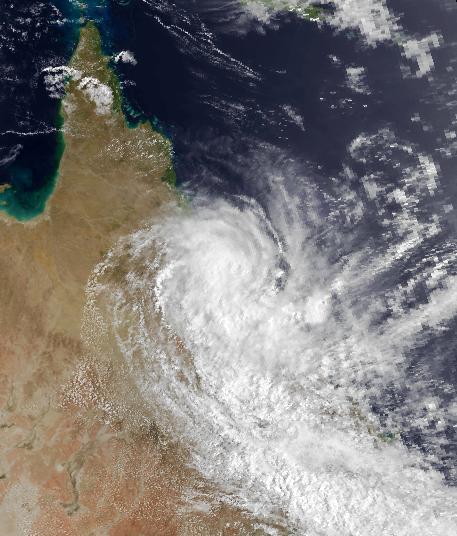
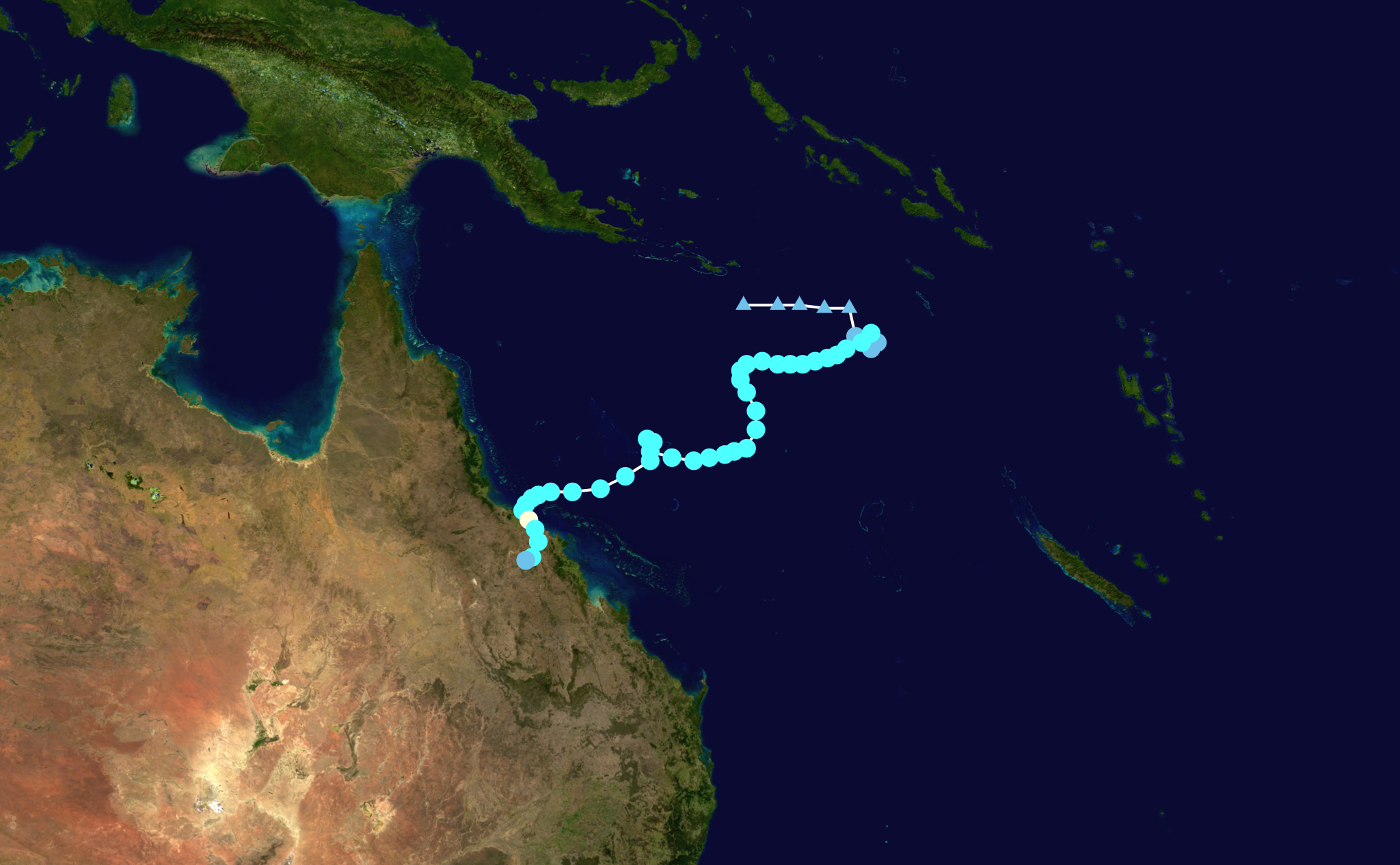
- Duration: 19 February – 1 March
- Peak intensity: 150 km/h (90 mph) (10-min); 972 hPa (mbar)

Early on 21 February, a tropical low formed over the Coral Sea. The system was upgraded to a tropical cyclone at 18:00 UTC on 22 February, given the name Charlie. Charlie continued to strengthen for around a day while turning towards the south, however began to weaken soon after. Following a period of slight weakening, Charlie maintained its intensity and slowly moved towards the west. Early on 27 February, Charlie began to intensify once again, continuing its westerly movement until 36 hours later, when it turned towards the south. Charlie made its first landfall near Cape Bowling Green and reached its peak intensity as a Category 3 severe tropical cyclone during 29 February and later made its second landfall, in Upstart Bay. The cyclone weakened rapidly over land and dissipated on 1 March.

As Charlie made landfall in a sparsely populated area, structural damage was minimal, however significant crop damage occurred, amounting to $15 million (1990 AUD).

=== Tropical Cyclone Herbie ===
- Category 1 tropical cyclone (Australian scale)
- Tropical storm (SSHWS)
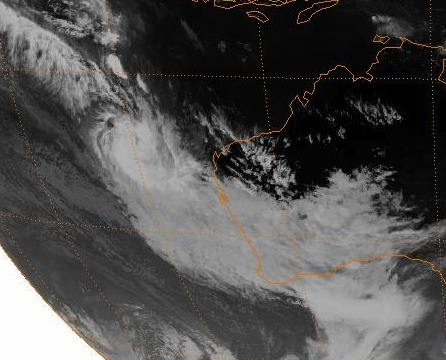
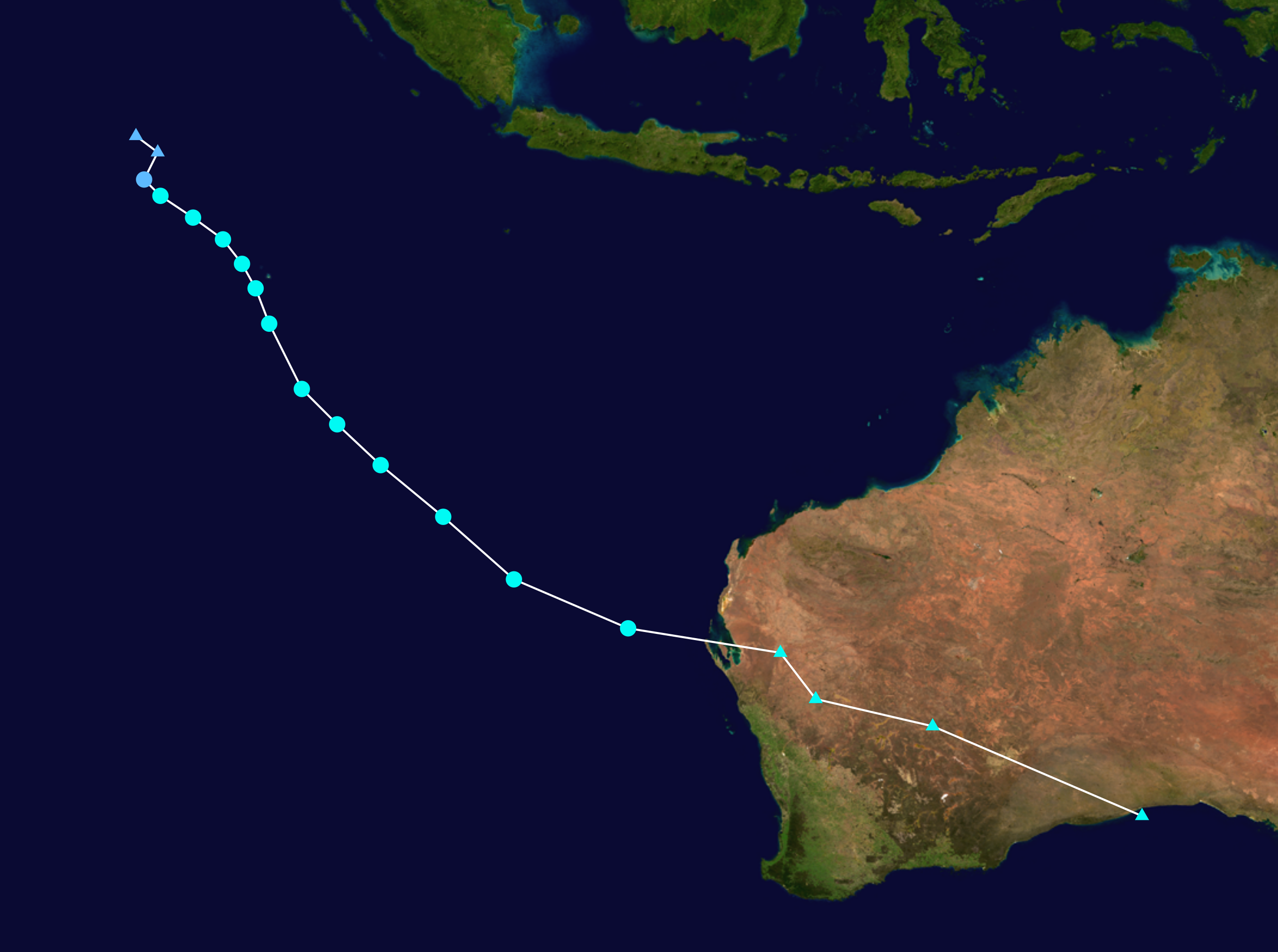
- Duration: 17 May – 21 May
- Peak intensity: 75 km/h (45 mph) (10-min); 990 hPa (mbar)

Herbie made landfall in Western Australia on 20 May, making it the only tropical cyclone to hit the state in May, it caused $15.6 million in damages, and was later retired, though it did not cause any fatalities.

== See also ==
- Atlantic hurricane seasons: 1987, 1988
- Eastern Pacific hurricane seasons: 1987, 1988
- Western Pacific typhoon seasons: 1987, 1988
- North Indian Ocean cyclone seasons: 1987, 1988
