= Timeline of the 1987 Atlantic hurricane season =

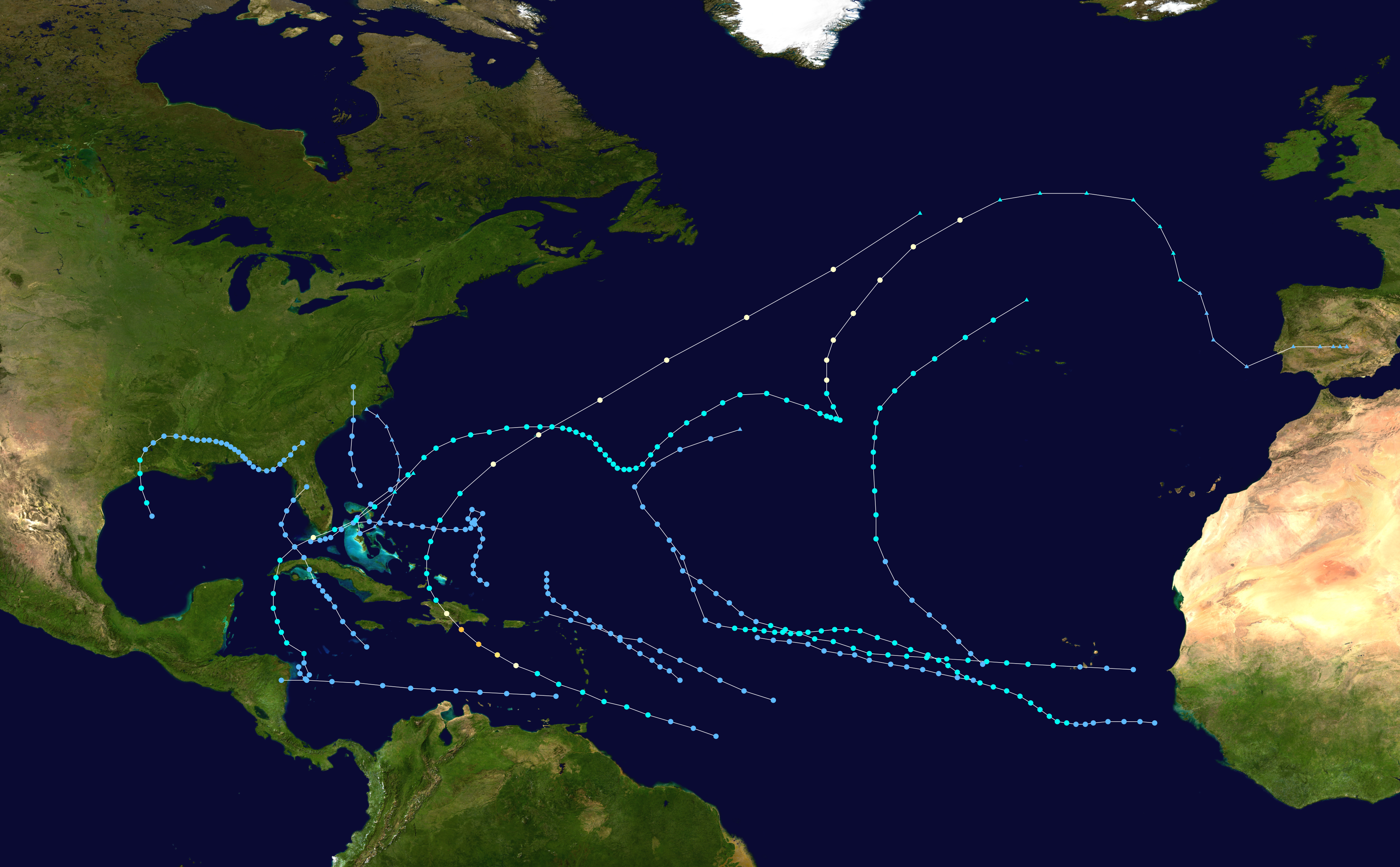
- Season summary map

Season boundaries
- First system formed: May 24, 1987
- Last system dissipated: November 4, 1987

Strongest system
- Name: Emily
- Maximum winds: 125 mph (205 km/h) (1-minute sustained)
- Lowest pressure: 958 mbar (hPa; 28.29 inHg)

Longest lasting system
- Name: Arlene
- Duration: 12.25 days
Storm articles
- 1987 Gulf Coast tropical storm
  (Tropical Storm Two)
- Hurricane Arlene (1987)
- Hurricane Emily (1987)
- Hurricane Floyd (1987)
- Tropical Depression Fourteen (1987)

The 1987 Atlantic hurricane season was an event in the annual Atlantic hurricane season in the north Atlantic Ocean. It was a below-average season, having fewer named storms than in a normal year, that resulted in little impact throughout the Atlantic basin; the United States recorded no hurricane-related fatalities, making the 1987 season the fourth to do so since 1976. The season officially began on June 1, 1987 and ended November 30, 1987. These dates, adopted by convention, historically describe the period in each year when most systems form. Even so, a pre-season storm, Tropical Depression One, led to the season's starting on May 25. Storm activity ended several weeks early; the final storm of the season, Tropical Depression Fourteen, dissipated on November 4.

The season had fourteen tropical depressions, of which seven intensified into tropical storms—an average season has ten tropical storms—three became hurricanes and one, Emily, became a major hurricane. (Note: A major hurricane is a storm that ranks as Category 3 or higher on the Saffir–Simpson scale.) The two most notable storms of the season were Hurricanes Arlene and Emily. Hurricane Arlene spent roughly 14.5 days as a tropical storm before intensifying into a hurricane. Hurricane Emily was the only major hurricane of the season; its wind speeds peaked at 125 miles per hour (201 km/h) before impacting the Dominican Republic.

This timeline documents tropical cyclone formations, strengthening, weakening, landfalls, extratropical transitions, and dissipations during the season. It includes information that was not released throughout the season, meaning that data from post-storm reviews by the National Hurricane Center, such as a storm that was not initially warned upon, has been included.

By convention, meteorologists one time zone when issuing forecasts and making observations: Coordinated Universal Time (UTC), and also use the 24-hour clock (where 00:00 = midnight UTC). In this time line, all information is listed by UTC first with the respective local time included in parentheses.

== Timeline ==
=== May ===
Satellite image of Tropical Depression One on May 26

May 24

- 8:00 am EDT (1200 UTC) – Tropical Depression One forms 170 miles (275 kilometers) (Note: The figures for maximum sustained winds and position estimates are rounded to the nearest 5 units (knots, miles, or kilometers), following the convention used in the National Hurricane Center's operational products for each storm. All other units are rounded to the nearest digit.) east-southeast of Cockburn Town, Turks and Caicos Islands.

May 30

- 8:00 am EDT (1200 UTC) – Tropical Depression One makes landfall on Great Abaco Island in the northern Bahamas with winds of 35 miles per hour (56 km/h).
- 2:00 pm EDT (1800 UTC) – Tropical Depression One passes over the Berry Islands with winds of 35 miles per hour (56 km/h).

May 31

- 8:00 am EDT (1200 UTC) – Tropical Depression One makes its closest approach to the Florida Keys, tracking within 20 miles (32 km) of Lower Matecumbe Key with winds of 30 miles per hour (48 km/h).
- 8:00 pm EDT (0000 UTC June 1) – Tropical Depression One dissipates in the Florida Strait.

=== June ===
- There was no tropical cyclone activity in the Atlantic basin during June.

June 1 The Atlantic hurricane season officially begins.

=== July ===
- There was no tropical cyclone activity in the Atlantic basin during July.

=== August ===
August 9

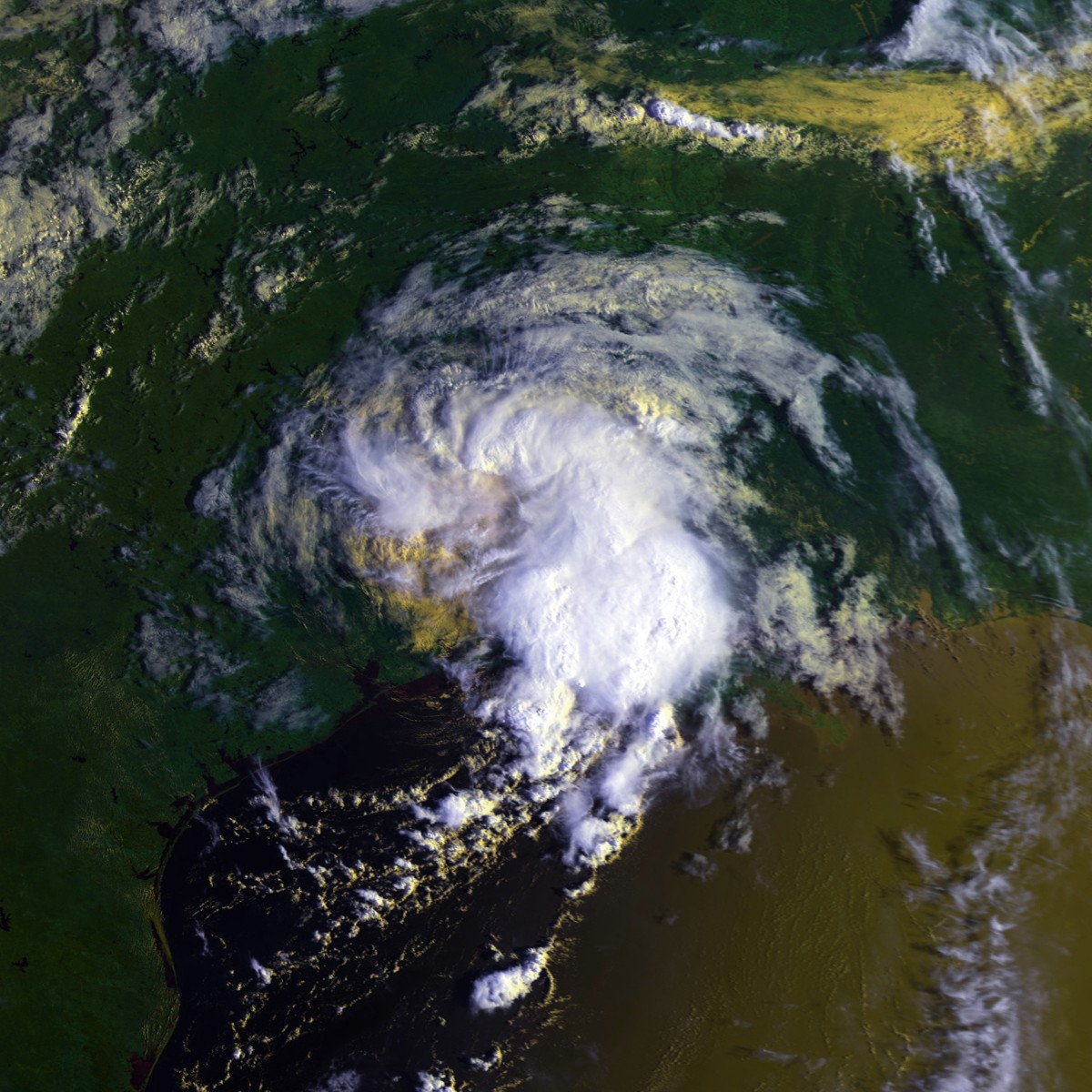
Tropical Storm Two on August 10

- 7:00 am CDT (1200 UTC) – Tropical Depression Two forms about 260 miles (420 km) southeast of Houston, Texas.
- 1:00 pm CDT (1800 UTC) – Tropical Depression Two intensifies into a Tropical Storm but is not assigned a name.

August 10

- 1:00 am CDT (0600 UTC) – Tropical Storm Two makes landfall near Galveston, Texas with winds of 45 miles per hour (72 km/h).

- 1:00 am CDT (0600 UTC) – Tropical Storm Two weakens into a tropical depression.

- 2:00 pm EDT (1800 UTC) – Tropical Depression Three forms over Andros Island in The Bahamas.
- 8:00 pm EDT (0000 UTC August 11) – Tropical Depression Three tracks over the Berry Islands with winds of 30 miles per hour (48 km/h).
- Exact time unknown – Tropical Depression Three makes landfall near Freeport on Grand Bahama Island.

August 11

- 2:00 pm EDT (1800 UTC) – Tropical Depression Three intensifies into Tropical Storm Arlene roughly 255 miles (410 km) northeast of Great Abaco Island in the Bahamas.

August 13

- 11:00 am AST (1500 UTC) – Tropical Storm Arlene makes its closest approach to Bermuda, tracking roughly 45 miles (72 km) to the north with winds of 65 miles per hour (105 km/h).
- 8:00 pm AST (0000 UTC August 14) – Tropical Depression Four forms about 840 mi (1,350 km) east-southeast of Barbados.

August 14

- 8:00 pm EDT (0000 UTC August 15) – Tropical Depression Two re-emerges into the Gulf of Mexico.

August 15

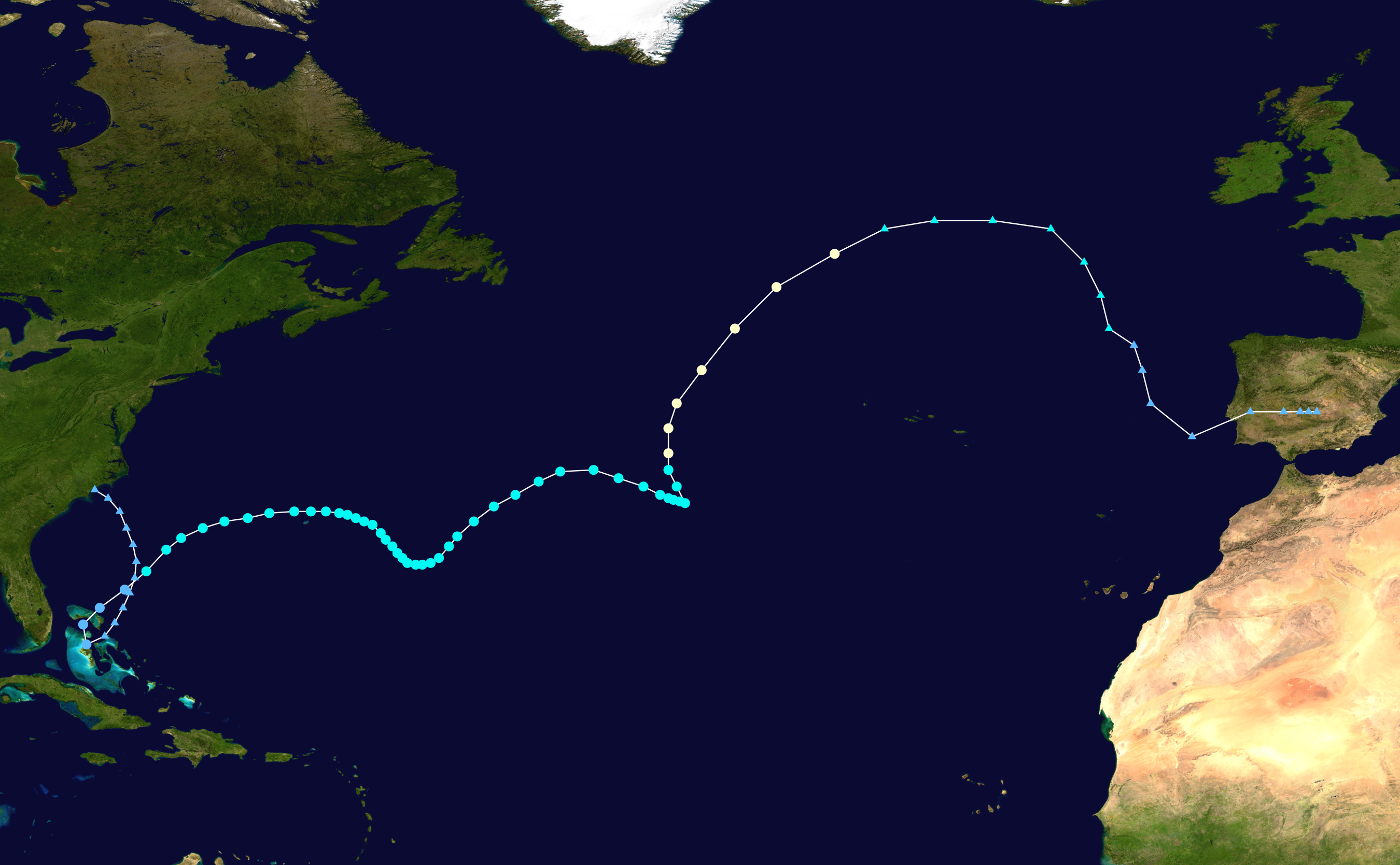
Track map of Hurricane Arlene

- 8:00 am AST (1200 UTC) – Tropical Depression Four dissipates roughly 55 miles (89 km) northeast of the British Virgin Islands.
- 2:00 pm EDT (1800 UTC) – Tropical Depression Two makes landfall in Gulf County, Florida with winds of 20 miles per hour (32 km/h).

August 17

- 2:00 am EDT (0600 UTC) – Tropical Depression Two dissipates over southeastern Georgia.

August 18

- 2:00 am AST (0600 UTC) – Tropical Depression Five forms roughly 170 miles (270 km) west of Dakar, Senegal.
- 8:00 am AST (1200 UTC) – Tropical Depression Five tracks over the southern Cape Verde Islands with winds of 35 miles per hour (56 km/h).
- 2:00 pm AST (1800 UTC) – Tropical Depression Five strengthens into Tropical Storm Bret about 85 miles (137 km) west-northwest of Brava, Cape Verde.

August 20

- 2:00 am AST (0600 UTC) – Tropical Storm Bret reaches its peak intensity with winds of 50 miles per hour (80 km/h) while located about 710 mi (1,145 km) west-northwest of Brava, Cape Verde.

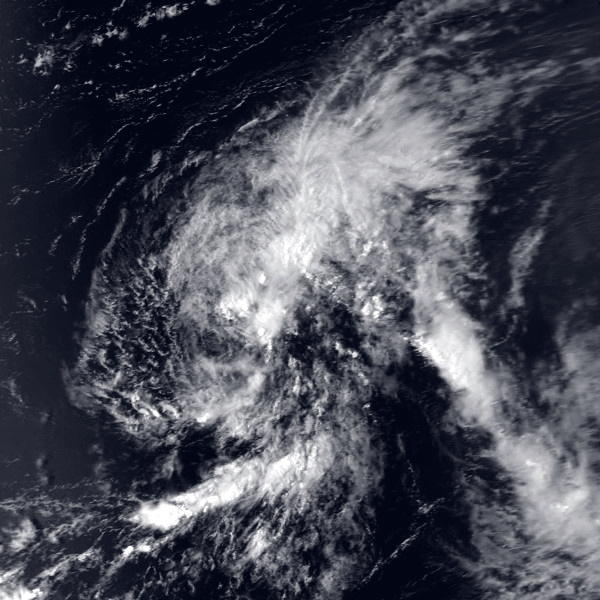
Tropical Depression Six on August 31

August 22

- 2:00 am AST (0600 UTC) – Tropical Storm Arlene intensifies into a Category 1 hurricane on the Saffir–Simpson hurricane scale while located about 815 mi (1,310 km) southwest of the Azores Islands.
- 8:00 am AST (1200 UTC) – Hurricane Arlene reaches its peak intensity with winds of 75 miles per hour (121 km/h) and a minimum barometric pressure of 987 mbar (hPa; 29.15 inHg).
- 2:00 am AST (0600 UTC) – Tropical Storm Bret weakens into a tropical depression while located about 825 mi (1,330 km) northeast of Barbados.

August 23

- 8:00 pm AST (0000 UTC) – The National Hurricane Center (NHC) issues their final advisory on Hurricane Arlene as it transitions into an extratropical cyclone.

August 24

- 8:00 am AST (1200 UTC) – Tropical Depression Bret degenerates into a tropical wave over the central Atlantic Ocean.

August 30

- 8:00 am AST (1200 UTC) – Tropical Depression Six forms roughly 515 miles (829 km) west-southwest of Brava, Cape Verde.

=== September ===
September 2

- 2:00 pm AST (1800 UTC) – Tropical Depression Six dissipates about 895 mi (1,440 km) west of Antigua and Barbuda.

September 5

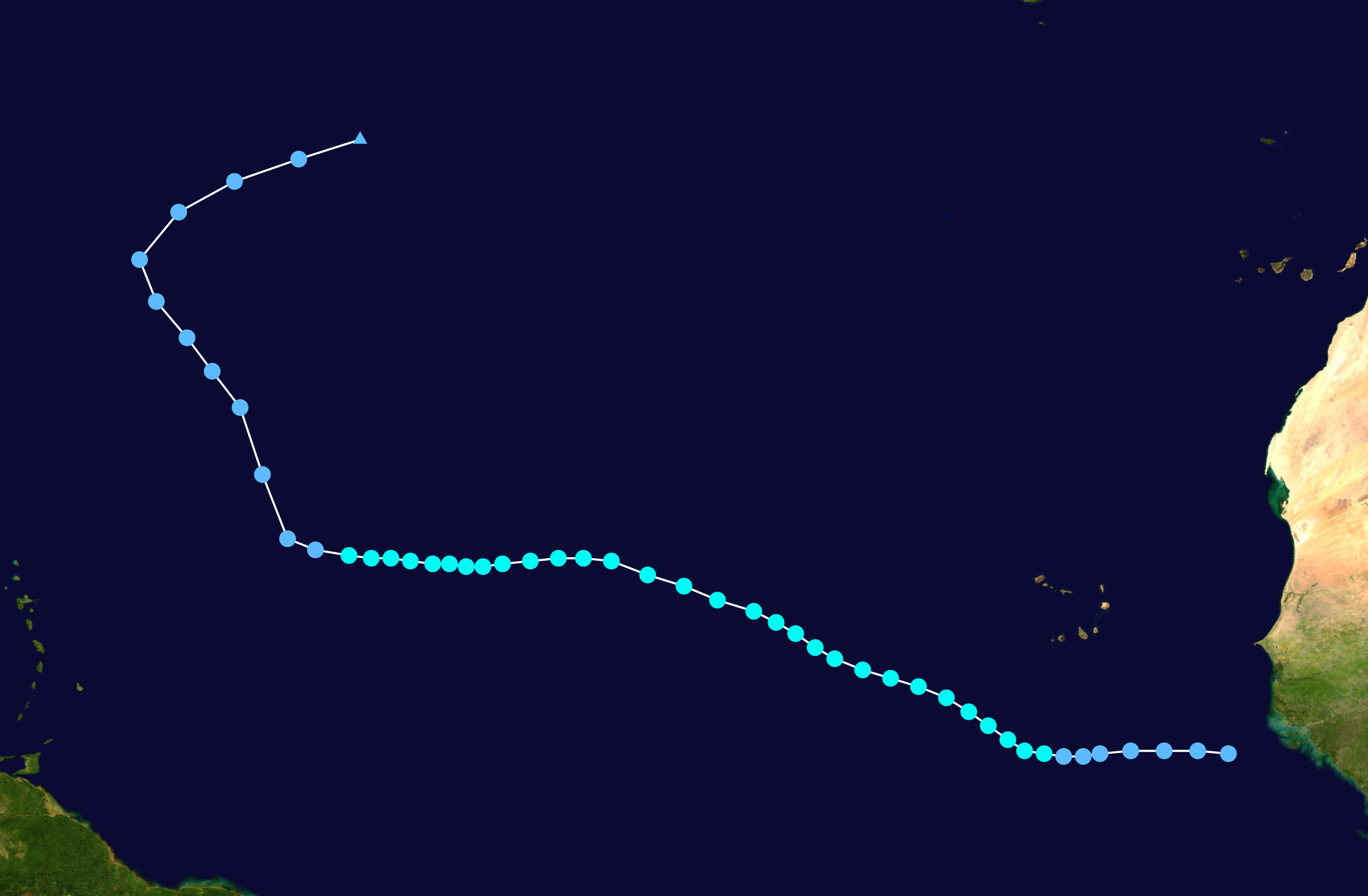
Track map of Tropical Storm Dennis

- 8:00 am AST (1200 UTC) – Tropical Depression Seven forms roughly 445 miles (716 km) west of Brava, Cape Verde.
- 8:00 pm AST (0000 UTC September 6) – Tropical Depression Eight forms around 115 miles (185 km) northwest of Tobago.

September 6

- 8:00 pm EDT (0000 UTC September 7) – Tropical Depression Nine forms roughly 145 miles (233 km) northeast of Freeport, Bahamas.

September 7

- 8:00 am AST (1200 UTC) – Tropical Depression Seven strengthens into Tropical Storm Cindy about 1,050 mi (1,690 km) northwest of the Cape Verde Islands.
- 2:00 pm AST (1800 UTC) – Tropical Depression Eight makes landfall with winds of 35 miles per hour (56 km/h) near Puerto Cabezas, Nicaragua shortly before dissipating.
- 2:00 pm EDT (0000 UTC September 8) – Tropical Depression Nine makes landfall near Myrtle Beach, South Carolina with winds of 35 miles per hour (56 km/h).

September 8

- 2:00 am EDT (0600 UTC) – Tropical Depression Nine dissipates over North Carolina.
- 2:00 pm AST (1800 UTC) – Tropical Depression Ten forms about 205 miles (330 km) southwest of Bissau, Guinea-Bissau.

September 10

- (1200 UTC) – Tropical Depression Ten strengthens into Tropical Storm Dennis while located about 275 miles (443 km) south of Brava, Cape Verde.
- 2:00 pm AST (1800 UTC) – The last advisory on Tropical Storm Cindy is released as it becomes extratropical over the northern Atlantic.

September 13

- 8:00 am AST (1200 UTC) – Tropical Depression Eleven forms near 375 miles (604 km) northeast of Barbados.

September 17

- 8:00 am AST (1200 UTC) – Tropical Depression Eleven dissipates about 280 miles (450 km) northeast of San Juan, Puerto Rico.

September 18

- 2:00 pm AST (1800 UTC) – Tropical Storm Dennis weakens into a tropical depression while located around 660 mi (1,060 km) northeast of Barbados.

September 19

- 8:00 pm AST (0000 UTC September 20) – Tropical Depression Twelve forms roughly 605 miles (974 km) southeast of Barbados.

September 20

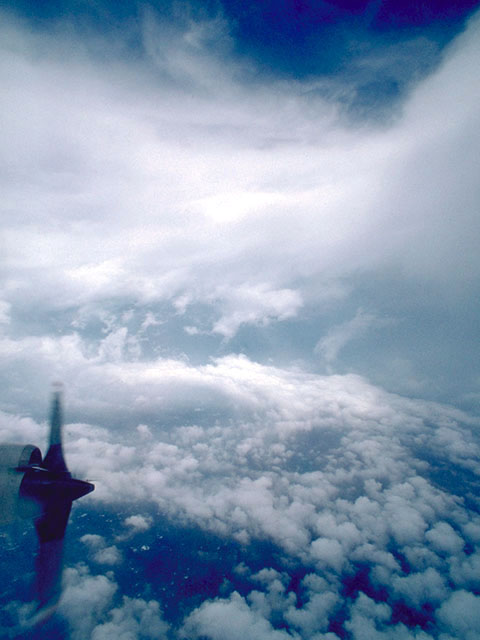
The eye of Hurricane Emily as seen by the Hurricane Hunters during a reconnaissance mission on September 22

- 2:00 pm AST (1800 UTC) – Tropical Depression Dennis transitions into an extratropical cyclone over the central Atlantic.
- 2:00 pm AST (1800 UTC) – Tropical Depression Twelve strengthens into Tropical Storm Emily while located about 245 miles (394 km) southeast of Barbados.

September 21

- 8:00 am AST (1200 UTC) – Tropical Storm Emily makes landfall in St. Vincent with winds of 50 miles per hour (80 km/h).

September 22

- 2:00 am AST (0600 UTC) – Tropical Storm Emily intensifies into a Category 1 hurricane.
- 8:00 am AST (1200 UTC) – Hurricane Emily intensifies into a Category 2 hurricane.
- 2:00 pm AST (1800 UTC) – Hurricane Emily reaches its peak intensity with winds of 125 miles per hour (201 km/h) as it intensifies into a Category 3 hurricane.
- 11:00 pm AST (0300 UTC) – Hurricane Emily weakens to a Category 2 hurricane and makes landfall near Barahona, Dominican Republic with winds of 110 miles per hour (180 km/h).

September 23

- 2:00 am AST (0600 UTC) – Hurricane Emily weakens into a Category 1 hurricane.
- 8:00 am AST (1200 UTC) – Hurricane Emily weakens into a tropical storm.

September 25

- 2:00 am AST (0600 UTC) – Tropical Storm Emily re-intensifies into a hurricane while located about 235 miles (378 km) southwest of Bermuda.
- 7:45 am AST (1145 UTC) – Hurricane Emily makes landfall in Bermuda with winds of 85 miles per hour (137 km/h).

September 26

- 2:00 pm AST (1800 UTC) – Hurricane Emily transitions into an extratropical cyclone over the northeastern Atlantic.

=== October ===
October 9

Hurricane Floyd on October 12

- 2:00 am EDT (0600 UTC) – Tropical Depression Thirteen forms roughly 85 miles (137 km) northeast of Puerto Cabezas, Nicaragua.

October 10

- 8:00 pm EDT (1200 UTC) – Tropical Depression Thirteen strengthens into Tropical Storm Floyd while located about 230 miles (370 km) south-southwest of Grand Cayman Island.

October 11

- 8:00 pm EDT (0000 UTC October 12) – Tropical Storm Floyd makes landfall in western Cuba near Guane.

October 12

- 8:00 am EDT (1200 UTC) – Tropical Storm Floyd intensifies into a Category 1 hurricane as it reaches its peak windspeeds of 75 miles per hour (121 km/h).
- 2:00 pm EDT (1800 UTC) – Hurricane Floyd tracks over the Florida Keys with winds of 75 miles per hour (121 km/h).
- 8:00 pm EDT (0000 UTC) – Hurricane Floyd weakens into a tropical storm.

October 13

- 2:00 pm EDT (1800 UTC) –Tropical Storm Floyd transitions into an extratropical cyclone to the northeast of the Bahamas.

October 31

- 2:00 pm EDT (1800 UTC) – Tropical Depression Fourteen forms roughly 110 miles (180 km) south-southeast of Kingston, Jamaica.

=== November ===
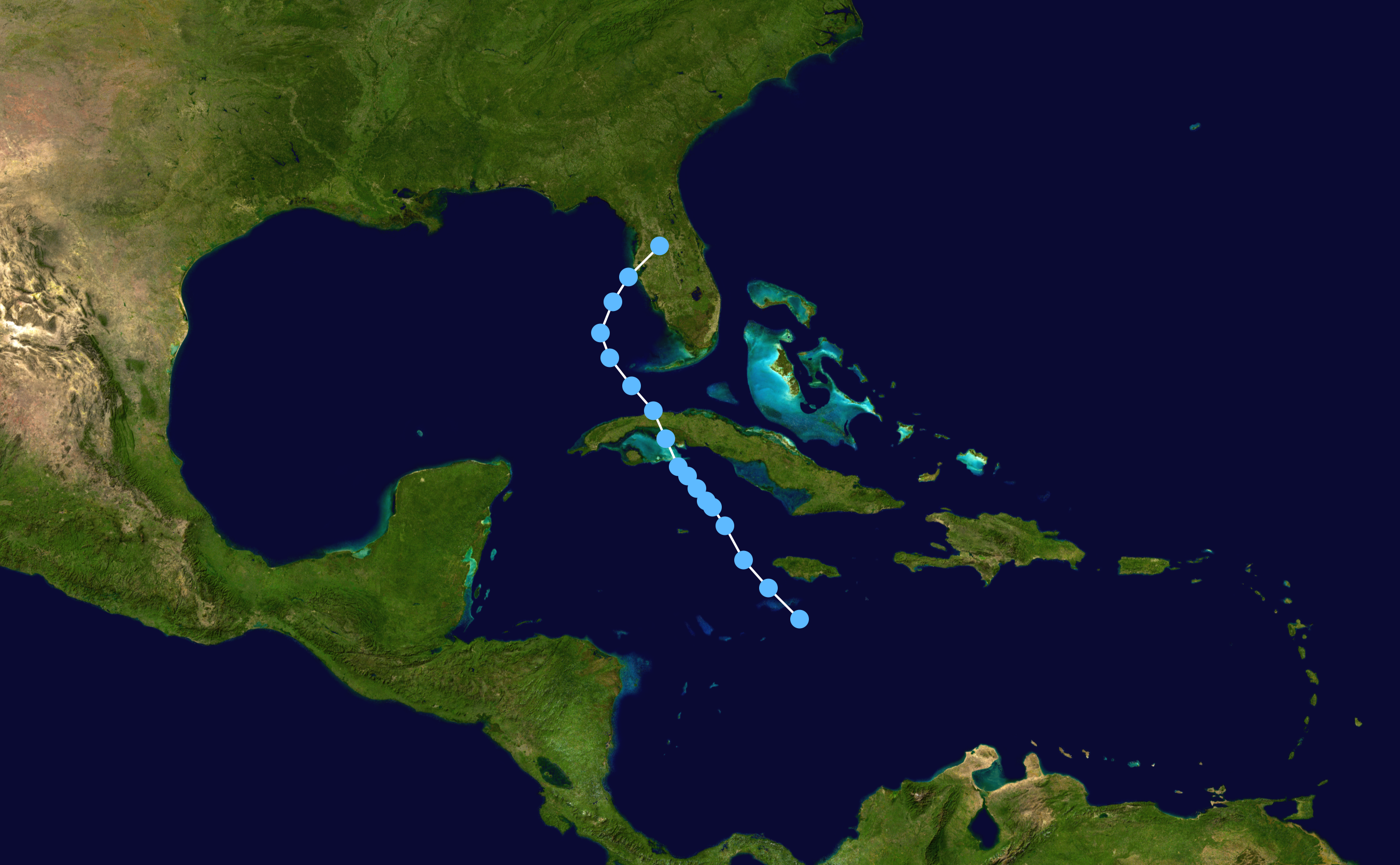
Track map of Tropical Depression Fourteen

November 2

- 8:00 pm EDT (0000 UTC November 3) – Tropical Depression Fourteen makes landfall in southern Matanzas Province, Cuba with winds of 35 miles per hour (56 km/h).
- Exact time unknown – Tropical Depression Fourteen makes landfall in southern La Habana Province, Cuba with winds of 35 miles per hour (56 km/h).

November 4

- 8:00 am EDT (1200 UTC) – Tropical Depression Fourteen makes landfall near Tampa, Florida.
- 2:00 pm EDT (1800 UTC) – Tropical Depression Fourteen dissipates over Florida.

November 30

- The Atlantic hurricane season officially ends.

== See also ==
- Lists of Atlantic hurricanes
