= 1987 hurricane season =

1987 hurricane season may refer to:

- 1987 Atlantic hurricane season
- 1987 Pacific hurricane season
