= List of storms named Arlene =

The name Arlene has been used for twelve tropical cyclones in the Atlantic Ocean, making Arlene the most frequently used storm name in the basin.

- Tropical Storm Arlene (1959) – a tropical storm which brought flooding to Louisiana, killing one person
- Hurricane Arlene (1963) – a Category 3 major hurricane which passed over Bermuda, only causing light damage
- Hurricane Arlene (1967) – a Category 1 hurricane in the central Atlantic Ocean which did not affect land
- Tropical Storm Arlene (1971) – a tropical storm that moved parallel to the east coast of the United States without making landfall
- Tropical Storm Arlene (1981) – a tropical storm that crossed Cuba and the Bahamas, with only minimal effects
- Hurricane Arlene (1987) – a Category 1 hurricane that spent much of its life as a tropical storm far from land
- Tropical Storm Arlene (1993) – a tropical storm that brought heavy rain to Mexico and Texas; killed 26 people
- Tropical Storm Arlene (1999) – a tropical storm that drifted past the east of Bermuda
- Tropical Storm Arlene (2005) – large tropical storm that made landfall in the Florida Panhandle; its remnants contributed to major flooding in upstate New York
- Tropical Storm Arlene (2011) – a strong tropical storm that made landfall on Mexico, killing at least 25 people along its path
- Tropical Storm Arlene (2017) – a short lived pre-season storm that meandered in the central Atlantic
- Tropical Storm Arlene (2023) – a short-lived tropical storm that erratically moved southwards

== See also ==
- Cyclone Marlene (1995) – a South-West Indian Ocean tropical cyclone with a similar name
