= 1987 Gulf Coast tropical storm =

Atlantic tropical storm in 1987

Tropical Storm Two
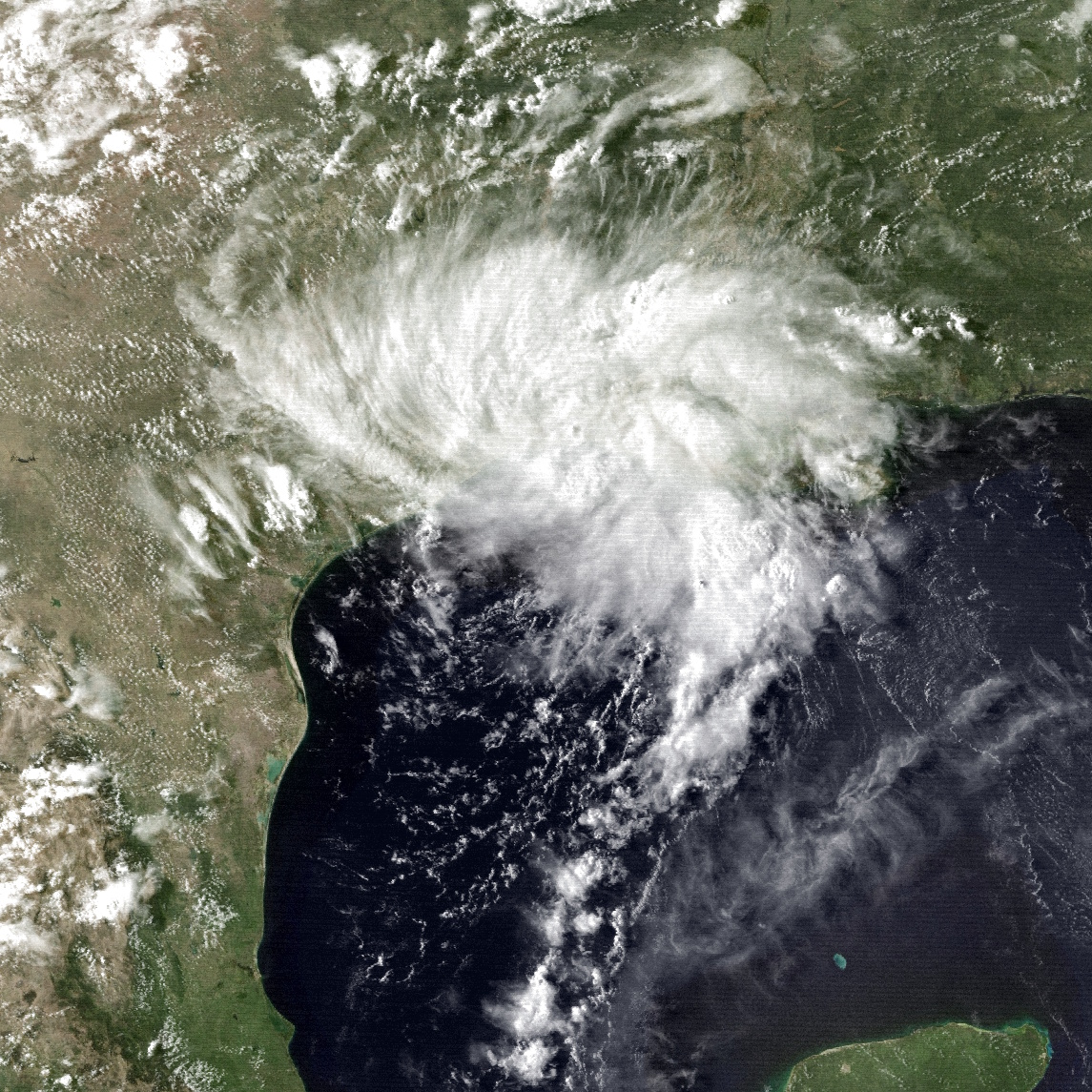
- The unnamed storm approaching Texas on August 9

Meteorological history
- Formed: August 9, 1987
- Dissipated: August 17, 1987

Tropical storm
- 1-minute sustained (SSHWS/NWS)
- Highest winds: 45 mph (75 km/h)
- Lowest pressure: 1007 mbar (hPa); 29.74 inHg

Overall effects
- Missing: 1
- Damage: $7.4 million (1987 USD)
- Areas affected: Gulf Coast of the United States
- IBTrACS
- Part of the 1987 Atlantic hurricane season

The 1987 Gulf Coast tropical storm caused flooding along the Gulf Coast of the United States. The second tropical cyclone and first tropical storm of the 1987 Atlantic hurricane season, it originated from a tropical wave in the Gulf of Mexico, southeast of Texas, on August 9. Initially a tropical depression, the cyclone moved north-northwestward and slightly intensified into a tropical storm later that day. By August 10, it made landfall between Galveston and Beaumont. The system weakened after moving inland and turned towards the east and later southeast. Briefly reemerging over the Gulf on August 15, the depression moved onshore a second time in Florida, before dissipating over eastern Georgia on August 17.

Due to the relatively weak nature of the system, it caused relatively little damage. However, the system dropped heavy rainfall, peaking at 21.05 inches (535 mm) in southern Mississippi. This resulted in flooding, which forced more than 400 people to evacuate their homes, some of which had 2 to 4 feet (0.61 to 1.22 m) of water. Flash flooding was reported in a few others states, including Alabama, Florida, and Louisiana. In all, losses from the unnamed storm reached $7.4 million (1987 USD) and one person was reported missing after being thrown overboard a boat in rough seas.

== Meteorological history ==
Map plotting the storm's track and intensity, according to the Saffir–Simpson scale Map key Saffir–Simpson scale Tropical depression (≤38 mph, ≤62 km/h) Tropical storm (39–73 mph, 63–118 km/h) Category 1 (74–95 mph, 119–153 km/h) Category 2 (96–110 mph, 154–177 km/h) Category 3 (111–129 mph, 178–208 km/h) Category 4 (130–156 mph, 209–251 km/h) Category 5 (≥157 mph, ≥252 km/h) Unknown Storm type Tropical cyclone Subtropical cyclone Extratropical cyclone, remnant low, tropical disturbance, or monsoon depression

On July 29, 1987, a tropical wave emerged off the west coast of Africa into the Atlantic Ocean. Tracking westward along the southern edge of the Saharan Air Layer, a feature associated with large masses of dry air, little convective development took place over the following several days. Once near the Lesser Antilles in early August, atmospheric conditions became more favorable for development. Traveling across the Caribbean, the system became increasingly organized and a mid-level circulation formed shortly before the wave moved inland over Central America on August 7. The following day, the northern portion of the wave interacted with a cold-core low over the Gulf of Mexico, resulting in the formation of a low-level circulation, exhibiting tropical characteristics, on August 9. Over the following two days, the system tracked in a general north-northwest direction towards the Texas coastline. Aided by an anticyclone aloft, outflow became pronounced and convection increased in coverage and intensity. Around 1200 UTC, the National Hurricane Center (NHC) estimated that the system developed into a tropical depression while located about 145 miles (235 km) south-southeast of Galveston, Texas.

Hours after being classified a tropical depression, the convective structure of the system deteriorated, a sign of a weakening storm; however, nearby oil rigs indicated a gradual increase in winds. Later on August 9, several rigs reported tropical storm-force winds – winds greater than 39 mph (63 km/h) – and the NHC estimated that the depression strengthened into a tropical storm. Operationally, however, these winds were considered to be related to local convective activity rather than the storm itself and it was not considered to be a tropical storm until post-storm analysis. As such, it was not named and is officially classified as "Unnamed Tropical Storm." Additionally, the strongest winds were located well away from the center of circulation, a signature of subtropical cyclones.

Remaining relatively weak, the unnamed system attained peak winds of 45 mph (75 km/h) before making landfall along the Texas coastline between Galveston and Beaumont at 0600 UTC on August 10. Once over land, the storm weakened to a tropical depression as it neared the Texas-Louisiana border and began a gradual turn towards the east-southeast. On August 12, while over central Mississippi, the cyclone attained its lowest barometric pressure of 1,007 mbar (29.7 inHg). On August 15, the low emerged back over the Gulf of Mexico after crossing the Florida Panhandle. No redevelopment took place during its brief time back over water before making its final landfall near St. Marks, Florida the following day. The depression gradually diminished before losing its identity over eastern Georgia on August 17.

== Preparations and impact ==
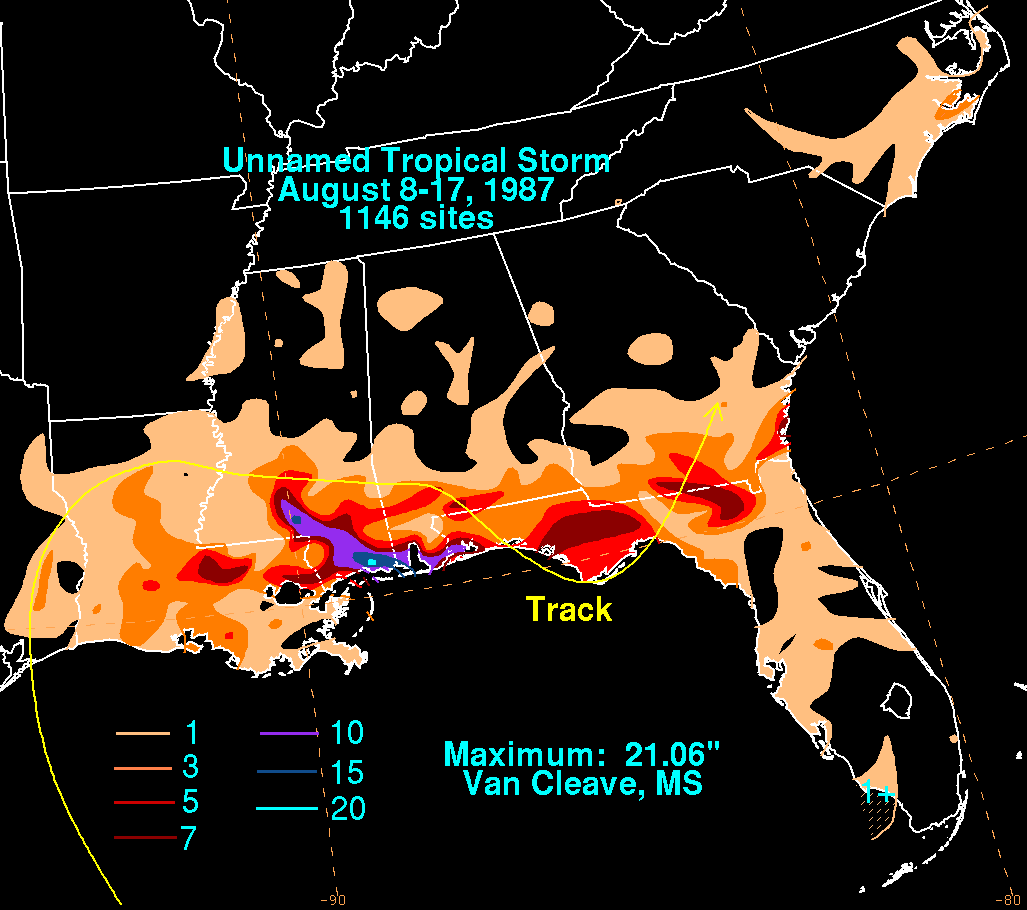
Rain totals across the southeastern United States from the Unnamed Tropical Storm

Due to the system's proximity to land upon being declared a tropical depression and subsequent intensity uncertainties, the unnamed storm posed several challenges to forecasters that "vividly illustrated limitations that are of major concern at the National Hurricane Center." With operational forecasters noting the possibility of intensification, the first-ever tropical storm warning was issued along the northern Gulf Coast between Matagorda, Texas and Morgan City, Louisiana on August 9. Prior to 1987, gale warnings were issued in areas where winds above 39 mph (63 km/h) were anticipated. This warning was later discontinued on August 10 once the system moved inland and weakened. The United States Coast Guard advised ships to seek harbor to avoid large swells associated with the cyclone. Additionally, some non-essential workers were evacuated from offshore rigs. By August 13, several flash flood watches were in place over portions of Mississippi, Alabama and Florida as remnants of the unnamed system slowly moved through the region.

Throughout the United States, damage from the tropical storm amounted to $7.4 million, the majority of which resulted from flooding. Offshore, a woman was reported missing after she was thrown off her boat amidst rough seas produced by the storm. The system produced rainfall across a large swath of the southern states, with many areas recording more than 5 in (130 mm). Though it made landfall in Texas, the system's asymmetric structure led to relatively little rain falling in the state, peaking at 4.25 in (108 mm) in Umbarger. In parts of Louisiana, many streets were left impassable by high waters, creating widespread traffic delays. The most significant impact took place in southern Mississippi where rainfall in excess of 12 in (300 mm), peaking at 21.06 in (535 mm) in Vancleave, caused significant flash flooding, especially along the Biloxi and Tchoutacabouffa Rivers. The former of these experienced a record crest of 16.8 ft (5.1 m). More than 400 people were forced to evacuate due to rising water across the region as several homes were inundated with 2 to 4 ft (0.61 to 1.22 m) of water. In Columbia, 12.2 in (310 mm) of rain fell in just eight hours, triggering flash floods that washed away a portion of a small dam. Further east in Baldwin County, Alabama and Pensacola, Florida, many roads ere closed or left impassable due to high water. The system spawned a brief tornado in Mobile County.

== See also ==
- List of North Carolina hurricanes (1980–present)
