= Tropical Depression Fourteen (1987) =

Atlantic tropical depression in 1987

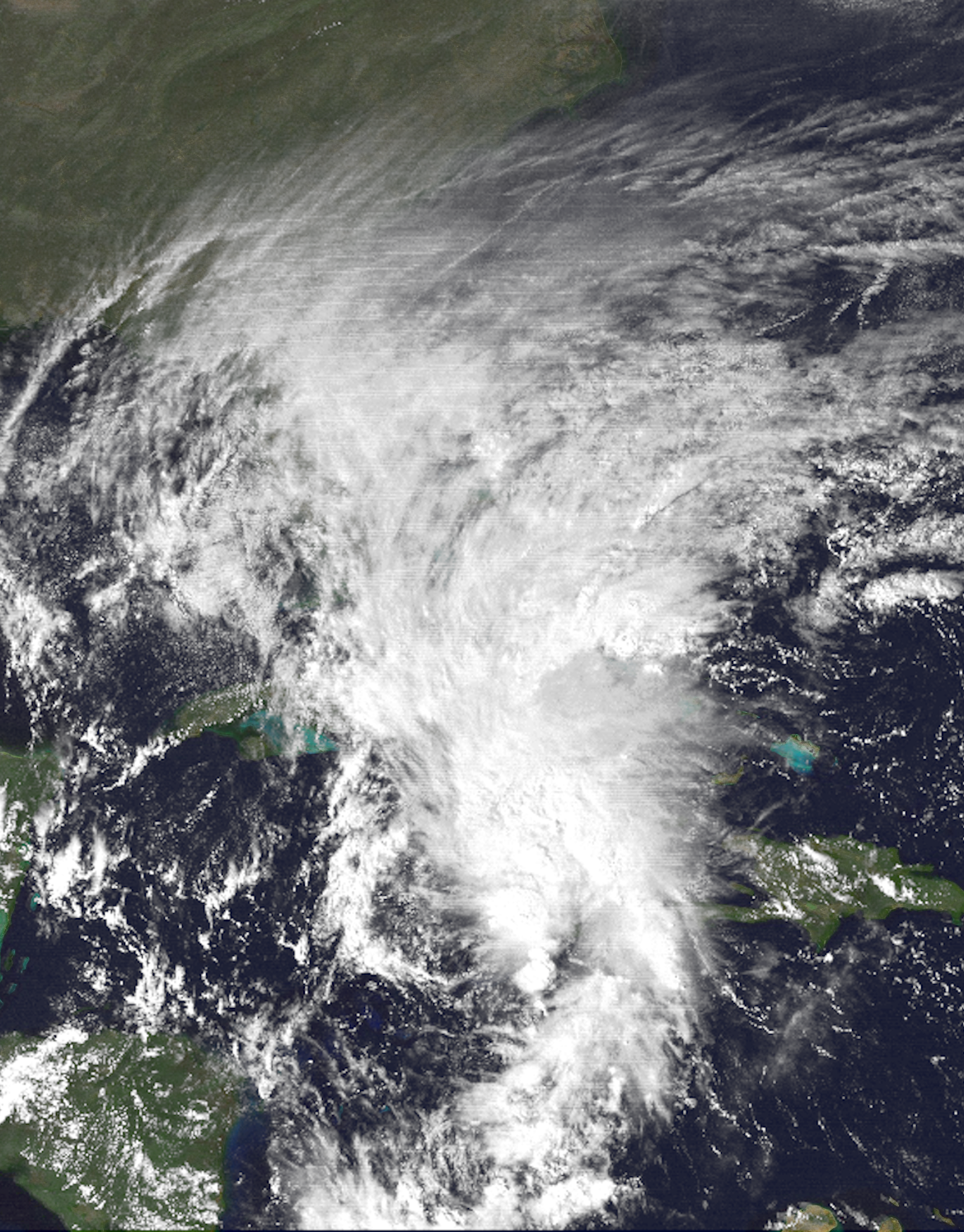
- Tropical Depression Fourteen over Cuba

Meteorological history
- Formed: October 31, 1987
- Dissipated: November 4, 1987

Tropical depression
- 1-minute sustained (SSHWS/NWS)
- Highest winds: 35 mph (55 km/h)
- Lowest pressure: 1004 mbar (hPa); 29.65 inHg

Overall effects
- Fatalities: 6 direct
- Damage: $1.8 million (1987 USD)
- Areas affected: Florida, Cuba, Jamaica
- IBTrACS
- Part of the 1987 Atlantic hurricane season

Tropical Depression Fourteen was the last tropical depression of the 1987 Atlantic hurricane season and was the third most destructive storm of the year. The depression formed on October 31, 1987, in the Caribbean Sea, heading along a northward path into the southern Gulf of Mexico and into Florida until the system was absorbed on November 4. The path and damage from the depression followed a similar path to Hurricane Floyd earlier in October. The depression peaked in intensity with wind speeds of 35 mph (56 km/h) on November 1 with a minimal barometric pressure reading of 1,004 millibars (29.6 inHg). However, certain barometric readings have considered that the depression may have become a tropical storm.

The depression in the time affected several cities and parishes in Jamaica and Cuba, along with causing significant rainfall in southern Florida. Jamaica was the area hardest hit by the depression, claiming the lives of six people and causing about $1.802 million (1987 USD, $3 million in 2009 USD) in damage. The depression caused floods that washed out villages, roads and bridges and caused dozens of landslides on the island. The island also had several rivers overflow including the Rio Minho and Rio Dogna. The damage caused by the tropical depression was comparable to previous flood in June 1986.

== Meteorological history ==
Map plotting the storm's track and intensity, according to the Saffir–Simpson scale Map key Saffir–Simpson scale Tropical depression (≤38 mph, ≤62 km/h) Tropical storm (39–73 mph, 63–118 km/h) Category 1 (74–95 mph, 119–153 km/h) Category 2 (96–110 mph, 154–177 km/h) Category 3 (111–129 mph, 178–208 km/h) Category 4 (130–156 mph, 209–251 km/h) Category 5 (≥157 mph, ≥252 km/h) Unknown Storm type Tropical cyclone Subtropical cyclone Extratropical cyclone, remnant low, tropical disturbance, or monsoon depression

Prior to the formation of Tropical Depression Fourteen, the southern Caribbean Sea was under a large area of low pressure. On October 30, satellite imagery showed that the area of pressure was beginning to form into a tropical disturbance. A reconnaissance aircraft was scheduled for the next morning to investigate the forming system, but by 1400 UTC on October 31, the National Hurricane Center in Miami, Florida had upgraded the system to a tropical depression based on the imagery and surface data. At this time, the specialists at the Hurricane Center believed that this was its most developed stage of its lifetime.

The depression began a movement to the northwest upon formation and on the night of October 31, the depression ran into a newly forming upper-level low near the Yucatan Peninsula. The interaction with the upper-level low caused shearing in the depression, and broke apart the previous low-level circulation that was developing. By the morning of November 1, the depression was nothing more than a swirl of low-level clouds near the center of circulation. After this, the depression could no longer attain the circulation it had previously developed. During the period of November 2 and 3, the depression moved to the northeast, crossing over the islands of Jamaica, Cayman and Cuba and then entering the southern parts of the Gulf of Mexico.

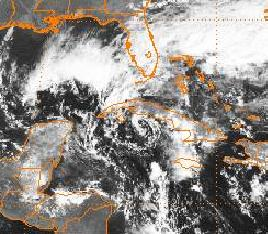
A disorganized Tropical Depression Fourteen near Cuba

On occasion, the convection of the system would flare up, and in the early morning hours of November 3, the Naval Air Station at Boca Chica, Florida reported winds of 50 mph (80 km/h), which would mean the depression may have attained tropical storm status. A similar report was filed at the Air Force Station at Cudjoe Key. After another reconnaissance flight was sent out to study the system, and recorded that surface area temperatures had dropped, the flight-level winds had reached 92 mph (148 km/h) and the surface area pressure had reached 998 millibars (29.5 inHg). In the evening and overnight hours of November 3, the tropical depression continued to the northeast, making landfall in Florida at a location near Tampa Bay. The depression crossed Florida, weakening significantly, and becoming extratropical. After emerging from land in the Atlantic Ocean on November 5, the depression had become a low pressure area once again and was last spotted that day near the Carolina Capes.

== Preparations and impact ==
The flash flood warnings released in relation to Tropical Depression Fourteen were centered in the area of Jamaica, which would later receive rainfall in excess of 9 inches (230 mm) as the center of the depression moved across the island. In the United States, the National Hurricane Center issued two tropical storm warnings in Florida. The first was from the middle and lower islands of the Florida Keys to the area of Dry Tortugas on November 1. The warning lasted only 24 hours, with the warning ending on November 2. The second issued tropical storm warning was from the area of Fort Myers Beach to Cedar Key on November 3. This also lasted only 24 hours and was discontinued on November 3. Forecasters also suggested on November 2 that boaters should avoid the area in or around Key Largo.

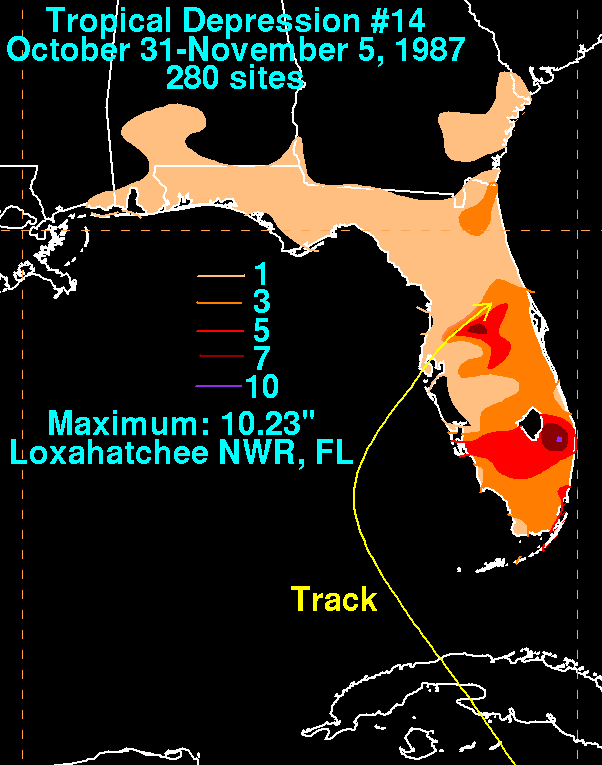
Rainfall totals in the United States

As the depression was moving to the west of the island of Jamaica, it caused significant rainfall on several parts of the island. Over a three-day period from October 31 to November 2, the rainfall reached as high as 10.21 inches (259 mm) at the capital city of Kingston, with a daily high of 6.38 inches (162 mm) on November 1. In Jamaica, gusts to 58 mph (93 km/h) were reported in the city of Kingston and sustained winds of about 45 mph (72 km/h). The significant rainfall caused major damage and issues on the island, with an estimated 1,000+ people being displaced from their homes and being placed into government shelters. Several residential communities were totally underwater from the rainfall, with local roads being washed away from landslides and floodwater, but these were restored quickly. The government of Jamaica also reported that three bridges were washed away from the heavy rain and resulting floods. According to the government, the country received $587,500 (1987 USD) of damage to the highways and streets, $11,000 (1987 USD) to the utilities around the island, $836,000 (1987 USD) to the agriculture system and about $372,000 to the health system. The total damage reached $1.802 million (1987 USD) on the island of Jamaica alone. There were also six recorded fatalities from the system.

In Cuba, the reported rainfall amounts reached about 4.75 inches (121 mm) in the community of Bahia Honda, along with 2.03 inches (52 mm) in the capital of Havana, and 2.75 inches (70 mm) in the community of Saua La Grande. The highest recorded winds over Cuba reached 25 mph (40 km/h) in the capital city of Havana. Wind gusts from Tropical Depression Fourteen exceeded 70 mph (110 km/h) near the Cudjoe Key Air Force Base on November 3. The Naval Air Station at Boca Chica reported gusts around 65 mph (105 km/h) and sustained winds of about 50 mph (80 km/h) on November 2. The remnants of the depression caused significant rainfall in the southeastern United States, with a peak of 10.23 inches (260 mm) at the Loxahatchee National Wildlife Refuge in Florida. The city of Miami reported rainfall totals of 4.42 and 5.90 inches (112 and 150 mm) in the community of Tavarnier. Rainfalls above 1 inch (25 mm) were reported in eastern Georgia, southern South Carolina, eastern Mississippi and eastern Alabama.

== See also ==
- List of Florida hurricanes
- 1935 Jérémie hurricane
- Tropical Depression One (1979)
- Hurricane Gustav (2008)
- Tropical Storm Nicole (2010)
