= Hurricane Arlene (1987) =

Category 1 Atlantic hurricane in 1987

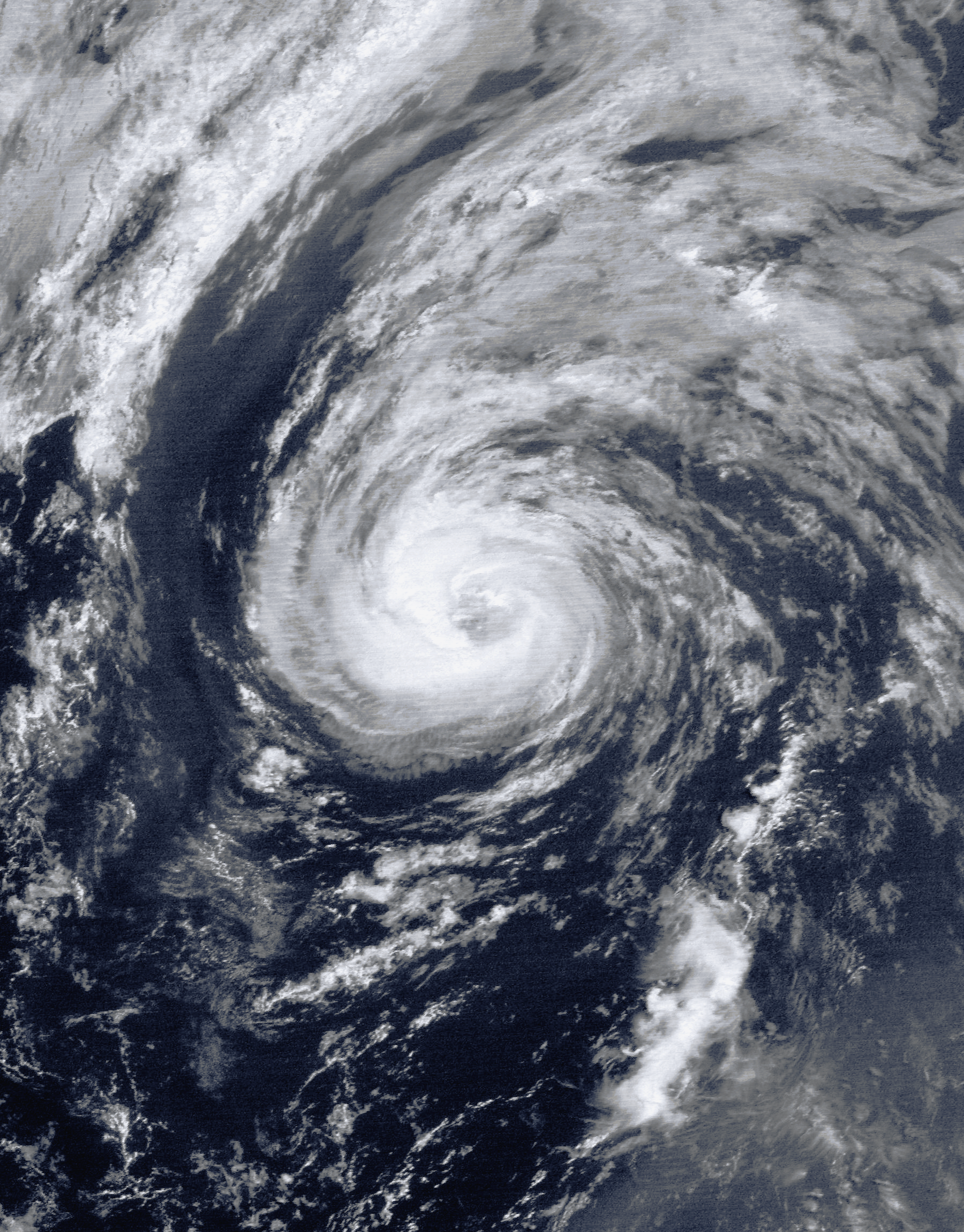
- Arlene at peak intensity in the North Atlantic Ocean on August 22

Meteorological history
- Formed: August 10, 1987
- Dissipated: August 23, 1987

Category 1 hurricane
- 1-minute sustained (SSHWS/NWS)
- Highest winds: 75 mph (120 km/h)
- Lowest pressure: 987 mbar (hPa); 29.15 inHg

Overall effects
- Fatalities: None
- Damage: $8,000 (1987 USD)
- Areas affected: Bahamas, Bermuda, Spain, Italy
- IBTrACS
- Part of the 1987 Atlantic hurricane season

Hurricane Arlene was a long-lived tropical cyclone that moved eastward in an erratic fashion in the northern Atlantic Ocean in mid-August 1987. The first named storm of the 1987 Atlantic hurricane season, Arlene formed out of an area of low pressure associated with a decaying frontal system along the North Carolina coastline, Arlene tracked in a general eastward direction across the Atlantic Ocean, taking an erratic track with several curves. On August 13, the storm brushed Bermuda as a weak tropical storm before continuing out to sea. On August 20, the storm briefly stalled before becoming a hurricane two days later. Early on August 24, the storm transitioned into an extratropical cyclone over the far north Atlantic before curving southeast and dissipating near the Iberian Peninsula on August 26.

In Bermuda, Arlene produced winds up to 58 mph (93 km/h) and waves up to 12 ft (3.7 m); however, little damage resulted from the storm. Offshore, a blind man was undertaking a challenge to become the first blind man to cross the Atlantic alone; he encountered rough seas and high winds from the storm, causing US$8,000 in damages to his ship over a two-day span. Between August 26 and 27, the remnants of the system produced heavy rains over portions of Western Europe.

== Meteorological history ==
Map plotting the storm's track and intensity, according to the Saffir–Simpson scale Map key Saffir–Simpson scale Tropical depression (≤38 mph, ≤62 km/h) Tropical storm (39–73 mph, 63–118 km/h) Category 1 (74–95 mph, 119–153 km/h) Category 2 (96–110 mph, 154–177 km/h) Category 3 (111–129 mph, 178–208 km/h) Category 4 (130–156 mph, 209–251 km/h) Category 5 (≥157 mph, ≥252 km/h) Unknown Storm type Tropical cyclone Subtropical cyclone Extratropical cyclone, remnant low, tropical disturbance, or monsoon depression

Hurricane Arlene originated out of an area of low pressure associated with a decaying frontal system along the North Carolina coastline on August 8. Tracking towards the southeast in a gradual anticyclonic loop, the system slowly increased in organization and intensity. By August 10, the low neared the Bahamas but remained disorganized. The following day, while located over Andros Island, the National Hurricane Center (NHC) upgraded the system to a tropical depression, the third of the season, based on its appearance on satellite imagery. Upon becoming a depression on August 10, the forward movement of the storm shifted to the northwest in response to an approaching trough off the Eastern United States and an elongated subtropical ridge to the south. The depression intensified into a tropical storm at 1800 UTC on August 11; however, operationally it was not upgraded until a reconnaissance mission by the hurricane hunters found flight-level winds of 50 mph (80 km/h). The storm tracked towards Bermuda along a trough of low pressure in the Atlantic Ocean. Throughout August 13, the proximity of Arlene to the trough prevented significant development. Around 1500 UTC, the center of Arlene tracked about 55 mi (89 km) north of Bermuda. Several hours later, a ship near the center of the storm reported 75 mph (121 km/h) winds; however, due to the disorganized presentation of the storm, these winds were not considered to be representative of Arlene's true intensity. Over the following several days, the storm tracked around several low pressure systems. By August 15, Arlene traveled southeast before re-curving to the northeast on August 18. The intensity of the storm also continuously fluctuated during this period peaking at 65 mph (105 km/h) and was as low as 40 mph (64 km/h).

The northeast movement followed a passing short-wave trough on August 18; the forward motion of the storm also increased due to the trough. On August 20, the steering currents around Arlene collapsed, leading to the storm nearly stalling for 24 hours. During this period, the storm developed excellent outflow and intensified. Operationally, Arlene was upgraded to a hurricane at 2200 UTC on August 20 based on the appearance of an eye-feature on satellite imagery; however, post-storm analysis indicated that the storm did not attain hurricane-status until 0600 UTC on August 22. This occurred 14.5 days after its formation. Upon attaining hurricane-status, Arlene rapidly tracked northward due to a strengthening area of high pressure near the Azores. Shortly after, the storm attained its peak intensity with winds of 75 mph (121 km/h) and a barometric pressure of 987 mbar (hPa). Continuing rapidly northward, the hurricane began to interact with a baroclinic zone over the cold waters of the north Atlantic. This resulted in the storm undergoing an extratropical transition which it completed by 0000 UTC on August 24. The extratropical remnants of the storm continued to track around the periphery of the high pressure system, turning towards the southeast the following day. By August 26, the storm became increasingly disorganized and hard to pinpoint on satellite imagery. The storm finally dissipated at 1800 UTC off the coast of Portugal that day.

== Preparations and impact ==
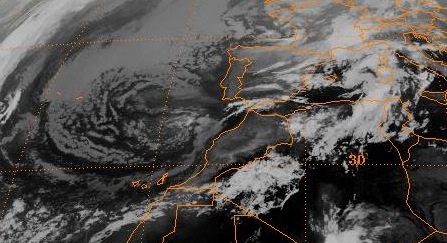
The remnants of Arlene near the Iberian Peninsula on August 27

As Tropical Storm Arlene tracked towards Bermuda, residents on the island were advised to take precautions and board up their homes. This followed the issuance of a tropical storm advisory for the island. On August 12, Arlene produced squally weather throughout Bermuda as the outer bands impacted the region. Rainfall from the storm peaked at 1.65 in (42 mm). A blind sailor was caught in the storm for two days while trying to become the first blind man to cross the Atlantic Ocean alone. On August 14, he encountered the full-force of the storm, 12 ft (3.7 m) seas and 60 mph (97 km/h) winds battered his 36 ft (11 m) sloop called the Eye Opener while trying to dock in Bermuda. The forced docking at Bermuda cost the sailor roughly US$8,000 due to damages from the storm. On August 14, Arlene brushed Bermuda, producing torrential rains, rough seas and gusty winds. The center of the storm remained far enough offshore that only minor damage occurred on the island. On August 26, the extratropical remnants of Arlene impacted Spain, bringing 1.25 in (32 mm) to Rota, surpassing the highest rainfall for the month of August set in 1971. The remnant moisture from Arlene continued through the Mediterranean Sea and produced heavy rains across Italy on August 27.

== See also ==
- Other storms of the same name
- List of Bermuda hurricanes
