= Typhoon Roy =

Pacific typhoon in 1988

Typhoon Roy (Asiang)
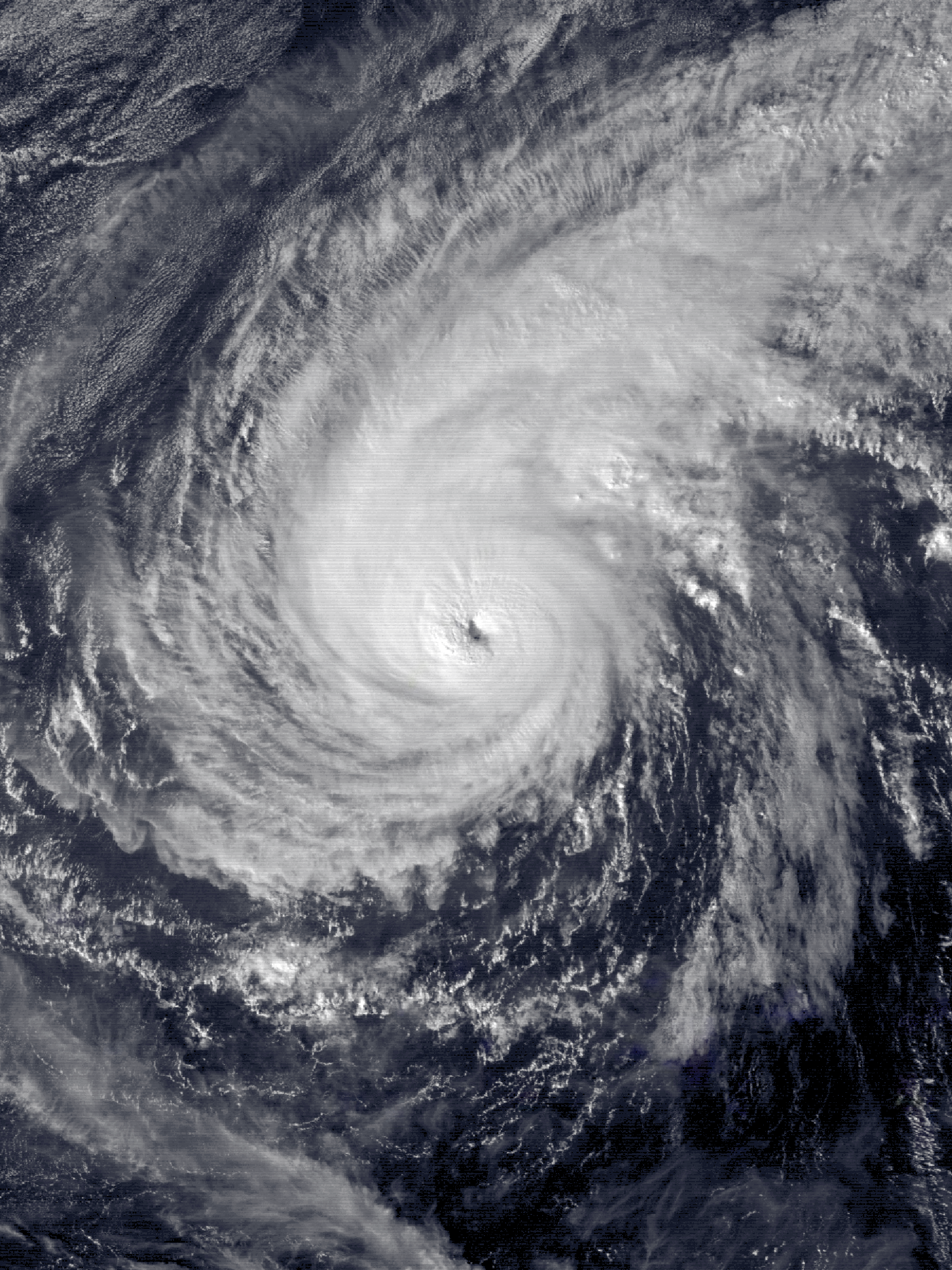
- Roy near peak intensity on January 12

Meteorological history
- Formed: January 7, 1988
- Dissipated: January 19, 1988

Very strong typhoon
- 10-minute sustained (JMA)
- Highest winds: 155 km/h (100 mph)
- Lowest pressure: 940 hPa (mbar); 27.76 inHg

Category 4-equivalent typhoon
- 1-minute sustained (SSHWS/JTWC)
- Highest winds: 215 km/h (130 mph)
- Lowest pressure: 927 hPa (mbar); 27.37 inHg

Overall effects
- Fatalities: 2 total
- Damage: $28.5 million (1988 USD)
- Areas affected: Marshall Islands, Mariana Islands, the Philippines
- IBTrACS
- Part of the 1988 Pacific typhoon season

Typhoon Roy, known in the Philippines as Typhoon Asiang, was the second-most intense January tropical cyclone on record in the Western Pacific basin. Forming out of an area of disturbed weather on January 7, 1988, Roy quickly intensified as it moved through the Marshall Islands. By January 9, the storm intensified into a typhoon and attained its peak intensity the following day. At its peak, sustained winds reached 215 km/h (135 mph). (Note: The JMA uses ten-minute sustained winds, while the JTWC uses one-minute sustained winds; the conversion factor between the two is 1.14x.) Slight weakening took place before the storm moved through the Mariana Islands. Continuing westward, the system eventually struck the Philippines as a minimal typhoon before dissipating over the South China Sea on January 19.

Throughout its track, Typhoon Roy was responsible for two fatalities and $28.5 million (1988 USD) in losses, mainly in the Mariana Islands. Light to moderate structural damage took place across the Marshall Islands as the system moved through the region as a tropical storm. On January 12, the typhoon caused widespread damage to Guam and Rota as it brushed the two islands, destroying at least 200 homes.

== Meteorological history ==
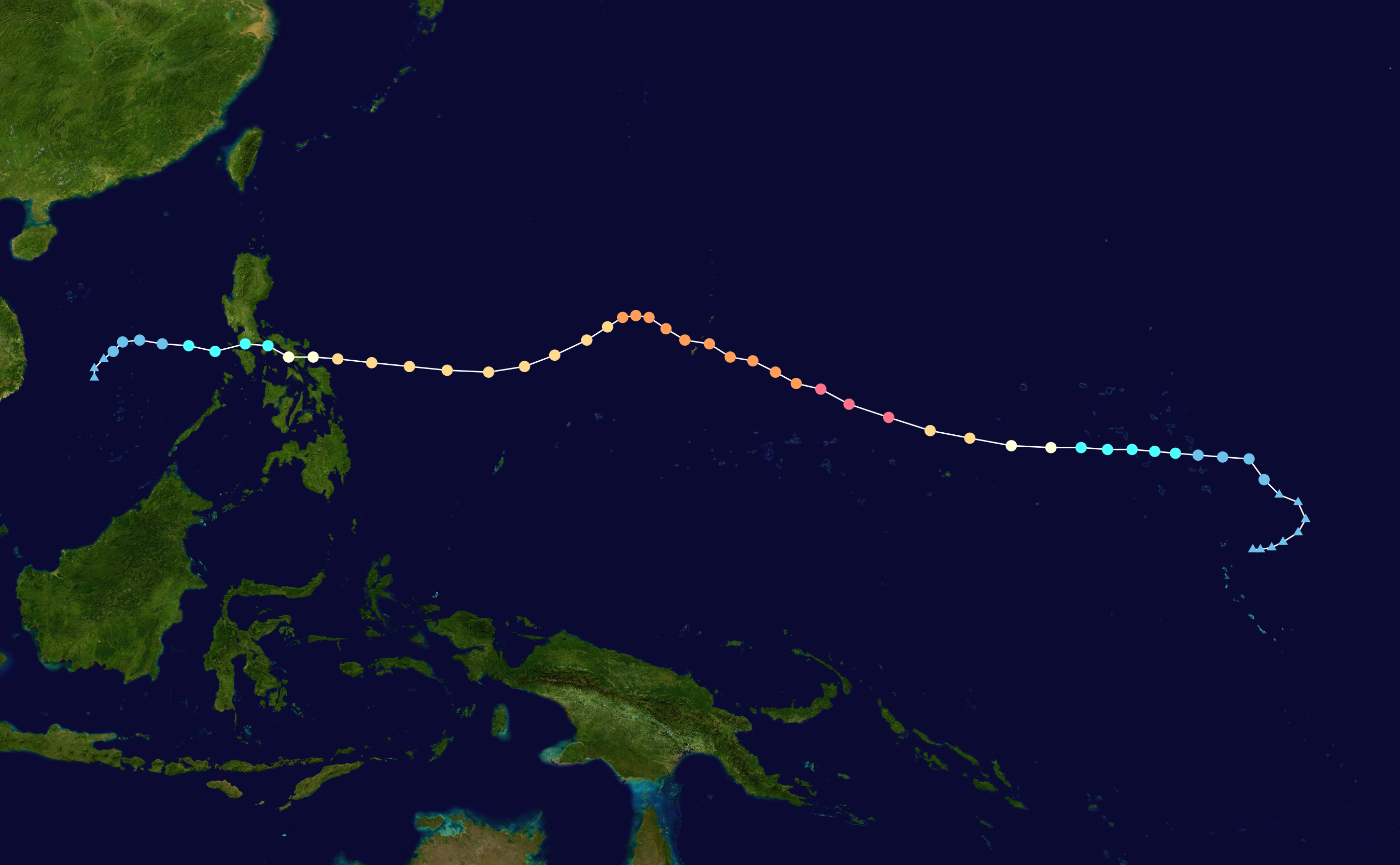
Map plotting the storm's track and intensity, according to the Saffir–Simpson scale Map key Saffir–Simpson scale Tropical depression (≤38 mph, ≤62 km/h) Tropical storm (39–73 mph, 63–118 km/h) Category 1 (74–95 mph, 119–153 km/h) Category 2 (96–110 mph, 154–177 km/h) Category 3 (111–129 mph, 178–208 km/h) Category 4 (130–156 mph, 209–251 km/h) Category 5 (≥157 mph, ≥252 km/h) Unknown Storm type Tropical cyclone Subtropical cyclone Extratropical cyclone, remnant low, tropical disturbance, or monsoon depression

Typhoon Roy originated from an area of disturbed weather in early January 1988 in the central Pacific. Above average sea surface temperatures in the area allowed for gradual development as convection increased. By January 6, the JTWC began monitoring the disturbance for the possibility of it developing into a tropical cyclone; a mirror system was present in the Southern Hemisphere at the same time. The system south of the equator eventually developed into Tropical Cyclone Anne. By January 7, the Japan Meteorological Agency (JMA) classified the system as a tropical depression; shortly thereafter, the JTWC issued a Tropical Cyclone Formation Alert for the depression. Early on January 8, the JTWC issued their first advisory on Tropical Depression 01W, at which time the system was located near the Marshall Islands.

Tracking nearly due west, the depression was upgraded to Tropical Storm Roy six hours after the first advisory based on satellite data. By this time, the JMA had already classified Roy as a tropical storm. Continued deepening took place as the storm moved through the Marshall Islands; weather radar data from Kwajalein Atoll indicated the formation of an eye several hours after Roy was named; this was later supported by satellite information on January 9, at which time the storm was upgraded to a typhoon. Embedded within a moderate east-southeasterly flow along the south side of a subtropical ridge, the typhoon accelerated, obtaining a forward speed of 40 km/h (25 mph).

During the afternoon of January 10, Roy reached its peak intensity as a low-range Category 4-equivalent typhoon on the Saffir–Simpson hurricane scale, attaining peak winds of 215 km/h (135 mph). At the same time, the JMA estimated that the storm attained peak winds of 155 km/h (95 mph) along with a barometric pressure of 940 mbar (hPa; 27.76 inHg). Upon reaching this strength, the storm was situated roughly 945 km (587 mi) east-southeast of Guam. Over the following few days, Roy gradually slowed and weakened as it neared the Mariana Islands. The storm made its closest approach to the islands early on January 12, passing within 14 km (8.7 mi) south of Rota. As the storm passed through the region, a new ridge built east of the typhoon, causing Roy to temporarily track southwestward before resuming a westward movement.

Moving along the southern edge of the ridge, Roy accelerated again as it headed towards the Philippines. On January 14, the storm crossed 135°E, prompting the Philippine Atmospheric, Geophysical and Astronomical Services Administration to issue advisories on Roy, assigning it with the local name Asiang. As it neared the country, wind shear began to increase, resulting in further weakening. On January 16, Roy made landfall in the Bicol Region as a minimal typhoon before weakening to shear and increased friction with the mountains of the Philippines. Later that day, the system weakened to a tropical storm before entering the South China Sea. The JTWC downgraded Roy to a tropical depression during the afternoon of January 17 and ceased issuing advisories early the next day. However, the JMA continued to monitor Roy as a tropical storm until the morning of January 18 and declared the system dissipated early on January 19, at which time the depression was situated roughly 700 km (430 mi) east-northeast of Ho Chi Minh City, Vietnam.

== Preparations and impact ==
On January 8, Roy passed near the Majuro island chain in the Marshall Islands as a minimal tropical storm. Sustained winds of 65 km/h (40 mph) and gusts up to 85 km/h (55 mph) affected the area, resulting in minor structural damage. Later that day, the intensifying storm passed close to Kwajalein Atoll, bringing strong winds and large swells. Moderate structural damage took place on Kwajalein Island where winds gusted up to 105 km/h (65 mph). Just to the north, more severe damage was recorded on Ebeye Island where low-lying areas were inundated by waves between 6.1 and 6.7 m (20 and 22 ft). Approximately one third of the homes on Ebeye were destroyed by the storm. One person was killed and damage was estimated at $5 million (1988 USD). An estimated 3,500 people were left homeless as a result of Roy in the Marshall Islands.

Ahead of Roy's arrival in the Mariana Islands and Guam, the public was given sufficient warning by the local disaster preparedness team. An estimated 1,200 people evacuated to shelters across Guam and all flights to and from the island were canceled for January 12.

On January 12, Typhoon Roy passed through the Mariana Islands and Guam, causing moderate structural damage and extensive crop losses. On Guam alone, agricultural losses reached $23.5 million (1988 USD; $64 million 2025 USD). Most structural damage was limited to broken windows on the island. Located within 15 km (9.3 mi) of Roy's eye during its passage of the Mariana Islands, Rota received the worst damage from the cyclone. Winds on the island gusted up to 193 km/h (120 mph), wreaking havoc to structures and vegetation. At least 200 of the 450 of homes on Rota were destroyed and the remainder were damaged; 95% of the power poles fell across the island, resulting in severe disruption to daily life. Roughly 80% of the concrete homes had their windows blown out. Four people were injured after the roof of one building was blown into another where people had sought shelter. One person died after suffering a heart attack induced by the storm. In the wake of the storm, the Federal Emergency Management Agency declared a state of emergency for Guam.

The last area affected by Typhoon Roy was the Philippines, which was struck by the storm on January 16. Prior to the storm's arrival, typhoon warnings were raised for 29 provinces in the country, including the capital city of Manila. In the Bicol Region, winds likely reached typhoon intensity; however, no known damage took place in the area. Continuing westward, the Roy brought gale-force winds to parts of southern Luzon before moving into the South China Sea. Low-lying areas in the storm's path were flooded by heavy rains and strong winds downed power lines in Sorsogon.

== Records and retirement ==
Since the JMA kept reliable records in 1951, Roy became the ninth known typhoon to develop during the month of January as well as the second most intense during the month, attaining a minimum pressure of 940 mbar (hPa; 27.76 inHg). It also attained the second-highest sustained winds during January, estimated at 150 km/h (95 mph). According to the JTWC, Roy was the third-most intense typhoon during the month, attaining peak winds of 215 km/h (135 mph) and an estimated pressure of 927 mbar (hPa; 27.37 inHg). In addition to intensity records, Typhoon Roy also was an unusually long-lived storm, spanning 12 days from formation to dissipation. This ranks it as the second-longest lived storm during January, just 12 hours short of Typhoon Alice in 1979.

Due to the severity of damage wrought by Typhoon Roy, the name was retired following its usage and replaced with Ryan. Since minimal damage took place in the Philippines, the name Asiang was not retired and was used again in 1992, 1996 and 2000 seasons, respectively.

== See also ==
- Other storms named Roy
- Other storms named Asiang
- Tropical Storm Mekkhala (2015)
- Typhoon Hagupit (2014)
