= List of storms named Roy =

The name Roy has been used to name three tropical cyclones in the Western Pacific Ocean.

- Tropical Storm Roy (1981) (Miling) – churned over the South China Sea.
- Tropical Storm Roy (1984) – a weak tropical storm that affected the Mariana Islands.
- Typhoon Roy (1988) (T8801, 01W, Asiang) – the second-most intense January Pacific typhoon on record; caused widespread damage on Guam and on Rota in the Mariana Islands.

The name Roy was retired following the 1988 typhoon season and was replaced with Ryan.
