= List of storms named Asiang =

The name Asiang has been used to name 10 tropical cyclones in the Philippine Area of Responsibility by PAGASA in the Western Pacific Ocean.

- Typhoon Tess (1964) (T6401, 01W, Asiang) – Category 2 typhoon; did not make landfall
- Tropical Depression 01W (1968) (01W, Asiang)
- Typhoon Kit (1972) (T7201, 01W, Asiang) – strong storm that killed 204 people in the Philippines and caused US$23 million in damages
- Typhoon Kathy (1976) (T7601, 01W, Asiang)
- Tropical Depression Asiang (1980)
- Tropical Storm Wynne (1984) (T8402, 02W, Asiang) – passed by the southern coast of Taiwan; led to flooding in Luzon; made landfall in China near the Luichow Peninsula
- Typhoon Roy (1988) (T8801, 01W, Asiang) – caused widespread damage on Guam and on Rota in the Mariana Islands; at its peak, sustained winds reached 135 mph (215 km/h)
- Typhoon Bobbie (1992) (T9203, 02W, Asiang) – struck southeast Japan, damage reached 371.8 million yen ($2.9 million)
- Tropical Depression Asiang (1996)
- Typhoon Damrey (2000) (T0001, 01W, Asiang) – strong Category 5 super typhoon; did not make landfall

After the 2000 season PAGASA revised their naming lists and the name Asiang was excluded.
