= Cyclone Anne =

Category 4 South Pacific cyclone in 1988

Severe Tropical Cyclone Anne
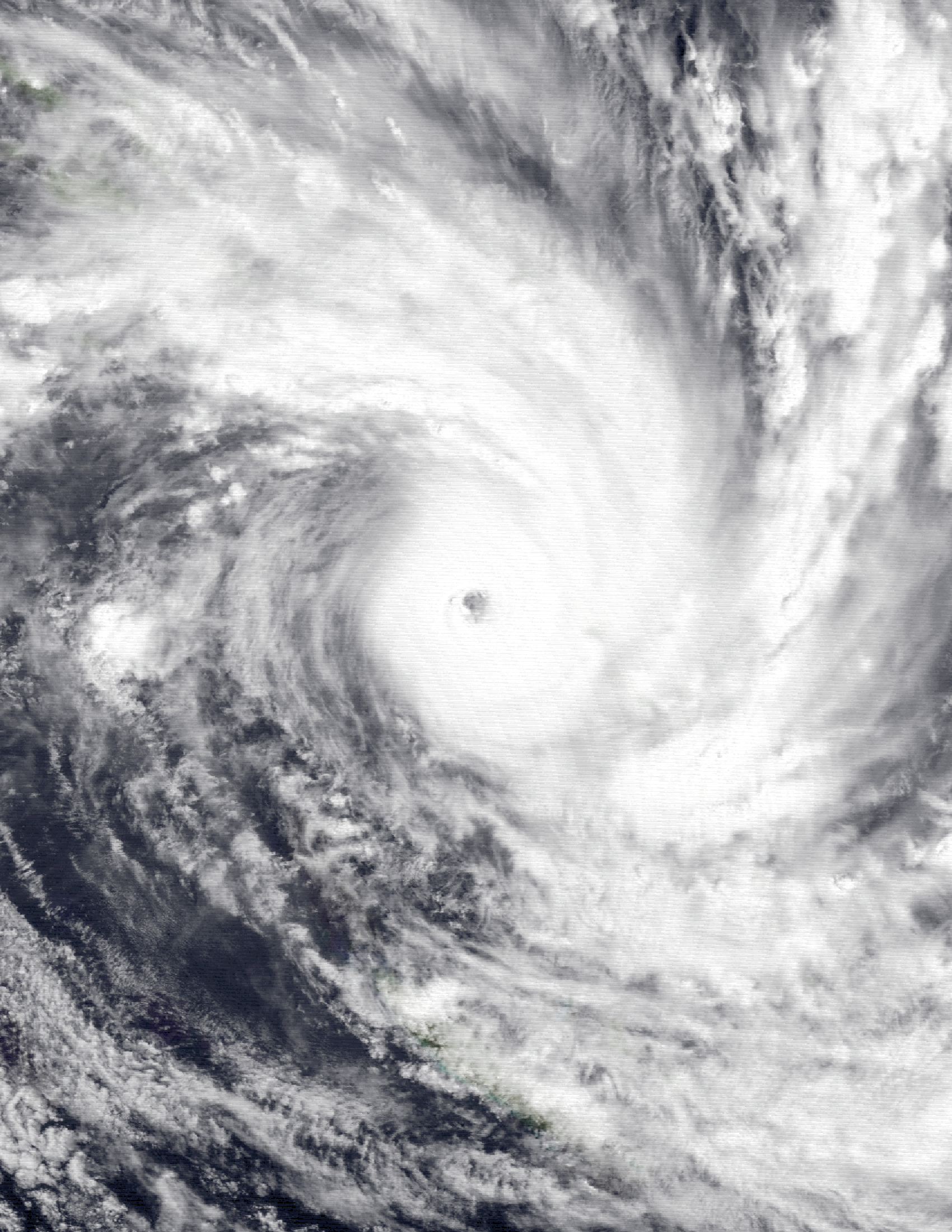
- Cyclone Anne west of Vanuatu at its peak intensity on January 11

Meteorological history
- Formed: January 5, 1988
- Dissipated: January 14, 1988

Category 4 severe tropical cyclone
- 10-minute sustained (MetService)
- Highest winds: 185 km/h (115 mph)
- Lowest pressure: 925 hPa (mbar); 27.32 inHg

Category 5-equivalent tropical cyclone
- 1-minute sustained (SSHWS/JTWC)
- Highest winds: 260 km/h (160 mph)
- Lowest pressure: 898 hPa (mbar); 26.52 inHg

Overall effects
- Fatalities: 2
- Damage: $500,000 (1988 USD)
- Areas affected: Tuvalu, Solomon Islands, Vanuatu, New Caledonia
- IBTrACS
- Part of the 1987–88 South Pacific cyclone season

Severe Tropical Cyclone Anne was one of the most intense tropical cyclones within the South Pacific basin during the 1980s. The cyclone was first noted on January 5, 1988 as a weak tropical depression to the northeast of Tuvalu, in conjunction with the future Typhoon Roy in the Northern Hemisphere. Over the next few days, the system gradually developed while moving southwestward. Once it became a tropical cyclone, it was named Anne on January 8. The next day, Anne rapidly intensified, becoming the fourth major tropical cyclone to affect Vanuatu within four years. On January 11, Anne peaked in intensity while it was equivalent to a Category 5 on the Saffir–Simpson hurricane wind scale, and a Category 4 on the Australian tropical cyclone intensity scale. After turning southward on January 12, Anne struck New Caledonia, becoming the strongest tropical cyclone to affect the French Overseas Territory. The system subsequently weakened as it started to interact with Tropical Cyclone Agi. Anne weakened into a depression and was last noted on January 14 to the south-east of New Caledonia.

Several islands within the Solomon Islands reported extensive property and crop damage. Within Vanuatu, Anne brought heavy rains, flooding, and a storm surge. These effects damaged houses, crops, and property, especially on Ureparapara islands and the Torres Islands. Extensive damage was reported in New Caledonia after it was exposed to a prolonged period of storm force winds, with the eastern and southern coasts particularly affected. On January 12, the system produced the highest daily rainfall totals since 1951 in several areas. Two people were killed after they attempted to cross a flooded river, and about 80 others were injured by the cyclone. Due to the impact of this storm, the name Anne was retired.

== Meteorological history ==
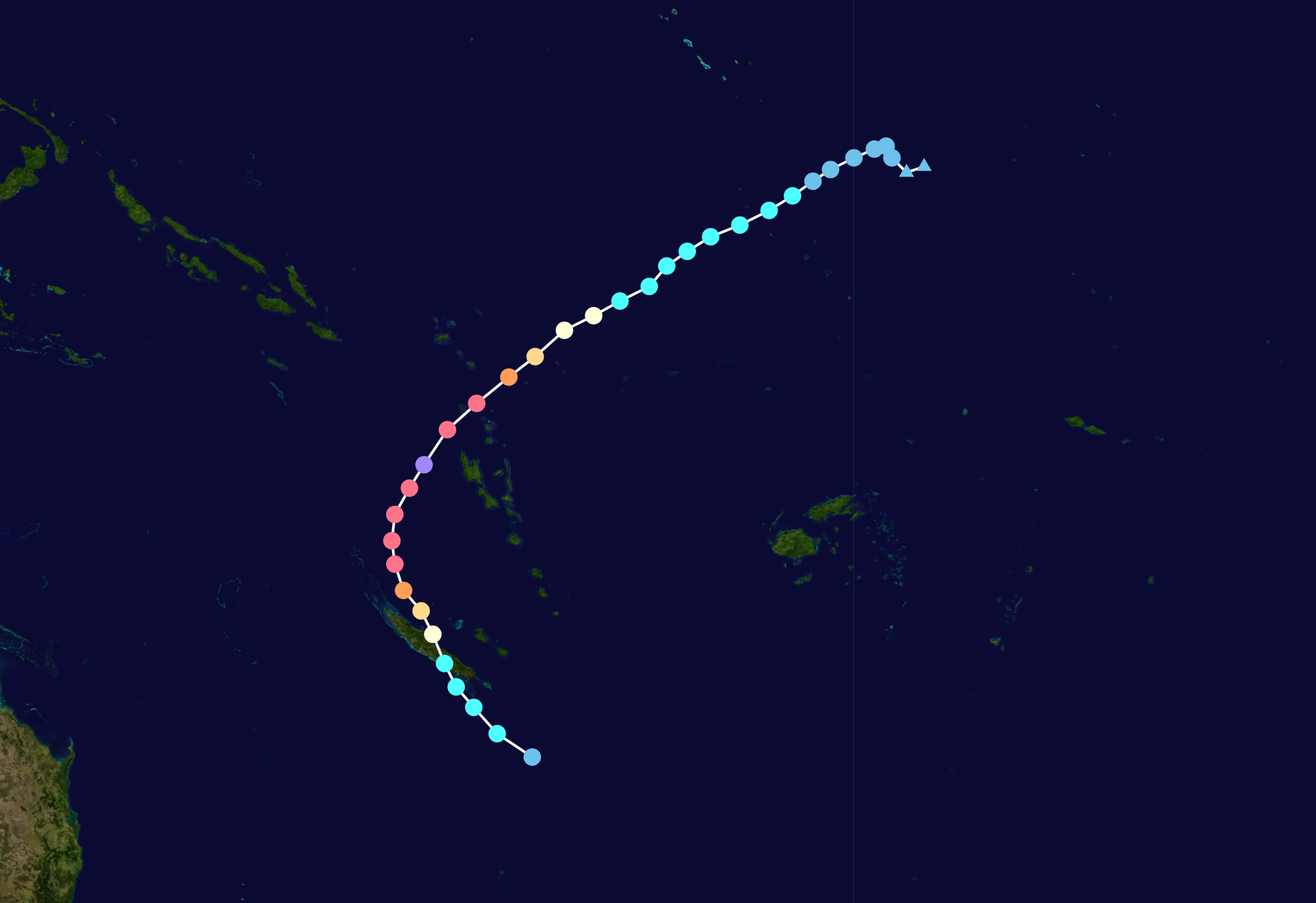
Map plotting the storm's track and intensity, according to the Saffir–Simpson scale Map key Saffir–Simpson scale Tropical depression (≤38 mph, ≤62 km/h) Tropical storm (39–73 mph, 63–118 km/h) Category 1 (74–95 mph, 119–153 km/h) Category 2 (96–110 mph, 154–177 km/h) Category 3 (111–129 mph, 178–208 km/h) Category 4 (130–156 mph, 209–251 km/h) Category 5 (≥157 mph, ≥252 km/h) Unknown Storm type Tropical cyclone Subtropical cyclone Extratropical cyclone, remnant low, tropical disturbance, or monsoon depression

On January 5, 1988, the Fiji Meteorological Service (FMS) started to monitor a shallow tropical depression that developed within the monsoon trough about 540 km (335 mi) northeast of Tuvalu. Around the same time, a twin depression developed within the Northern Hemisphere monsoon trough, which eventually became Typhoon Roy. Over the next two days, the Southern Hemisphere system developed further as it was steered towards the south-southwest along an area of high pressure, before it became equivalent to a tropical storm while passing through the Tuvaluan islands. As a result, the United States Joint Typhoon Warning Center (JTWC) designated the system as Tropical Cyclone 07P and started to issue advisories on it. As the system organized further, the FMS named the storm Anne after it became equivalent to a modern-day Category 2 on the Australian tropical cyclone intensity scale. On January 9, the cyclone started to rapidly intensify while continuing to move towards the south-southwest. Later that day, the JTWC reported that the system had become equivalent to a Category 1 on the Saffir–Simpson hurricane wind scale (SSHWS), and the FMS upgraded Anne to a Category 3 severe tropical cyclone on the Australian scale. Early on January 10, the cyclone moved through Temotu Province and passed about 55 km (35 mi) to the northwest of Anuta Island.

Later on January 10, Anne passed directly over Vanuatu's Torres Islands and came within 65 km (40 mi) of Ureparapara in the Banks Islands. The cyclone continued to move to the south-southwest and affected the northern islands of Vanuatu. Early on January 11, the FMS reported that Anne had peaked, with estimated 10-minute sustained winds near its center of 185 km/h (115 mph), equivalent to a Category 4 severe tropical cyclone on the Australian scale. Around the same time, the JTWC reported that Anne had peak 1-minute sustained winds of 260 km/h (160 mph), which made it equivalent to a Category 5 hurricane on the SSHWS. This made it one of the most intense tropical cyclones of the 1980s. Over the next day, Cyclone Anne turned south and rapidly weakened as it encountered upper-level wind shear, approaching the French overseas territory of New Caledonia. Late on January 12, Anne weakened into a modern-day Category 2 tropical cyclone before it made landfall on New Caledonia about 110 km (70 mi) to the north-northwest of Nouméa. After the cyclone re-emerged into the Coral Sea, the system started to interact with Cyclone Agi, which had rapidly moved south-eastward towards the "relatively deeper" Anne. Agi had developed two days prior near the Louisiade Archipelago, about 1,200 km (745 mi) northwest of Cyclone Anne. Early on January 14, Anne weakened into a depression before dissipating to the southeast of New Caledonia, after it was caught up in the upper westerly flow.

== Preparations and impact ==
During its early stages of development, Anne passed through the central islands of Tuvalu, causing minor damage to houses and crops such as bananas and coconuts. The storm passed to the north of Funafuti where strong gale force winds of 70 km/h (45 mph) were recorded. The system subsequently affected the Solomon Island province of Temotu between January 9 – 10 while it had sustained winds of 150 km/h (95 mph). However, the cyclone's center did not pass directly over any island, and the smaller islands escaped the destructive hurricane-force winds. Because Anne moved through the province at about 30 km/h (20 mph), any gale and storm force winds that affected the islands were not prolonged. Anuta, Utupua, the Duff Islands and the Reef Islands all reported extensive damage to property and crops, with at least 25 houses and 5 classrooms damaged.

The system affected the Northern Vanuatu Islands between January 10 – 11 and was the fourth major tropical cyclone to affect the island nation since 1985, after Severe Tropical Cyclones Eric, Nigel and Uma. Ahead of Anne affecting Vanuatu, various alerts and warnings were issued including a hurricane warning. During January 10, the cyclone directly passed over the Torres Islands and came within 65 km (40 mi) of the Banks Islands, although it missed Vanuatu's most populated districts around Port Vila and the rest of Espiritu Santo. Within Vanuatu, over 1600 people were made homeless while wind gusts of up to 225 km/h (140 mph) were recorded. Torrential rain, flooding and storm surge caused damage to houses, crops and property while triggering a landslide on the island of Epi. The hardest hit area was Torba Province with severe damage recorded on the islands of Ureparapara and the Torres Islands, while extensive damage was recorded on the islands of Vanua Lava and Gaua. Within the province, virtually the whole population lost their houses, as well as their cash crops. There were reports of 4–5 m (13–16 ft) tidal waves, washing away houses on the west coast of Ureparapara, while significant wave heights of over 11 m (36 ft) were recorded. Within the province of Sanma, severe damage was recorded on Espiritu Santo after Anne flooded huts, unroofed school buildings, uprooted coconut trees and destroyed the main wharf. Overall the total damages from Anne in Vanuatu, were estimated at US$500,000.

In conjunction with Tropical Cyclone Agi, Anne affected the whole of New Caledonia between January 11–15, becoming the most powerful tropical cyclone to affect the French overseas territory in 12 years. Winds in Noumea reached up to 150 km/h (95 mph), although there was no serious damage there. Prolonged storm force winds left extensive damage to the island, with the eastern and southern coasts particularly affected. On January 12, the system produced the highest daily rainfall totals since 1951, with Noumea recording 262 mm (10.3 in). Larger rainfall totals included 713 mm (28.1 in) in Goro and 519 mm (20.4 in) in Thio. Two people were killed after they attempted to cross a flooded river. Floods also swept away crops, huts and topsoil belonging to indigenous Melanesians that lived in coastal villages. Some areas reported crop damage between 90 and 100%. Most of the roads within the territory were left unusable while all international flights to the territory were cancelled. About half of the houses in Poindimié were damaged or destroyed. The last wooden Royal Navy boat was scheduled to be sunk on January 12, but was moved to January 19 due to the cyclones. Overall, there were about 80 injuries related to the cyclone in New Caledonia.

== Aftermath ==
The aftermath of the cyclone was marked by a distinct lack of a quantitative assessment within the Solomon Islands; with few boats or aircraft near the remote islands, relief measures were slow to get underway. However, 11 men aboard the United States Navy vessel USS Barbour County received Humanitarian Service Medals from the United States Department of Defense after aiding storm victims on Tikopia and Anuta from January 16 to 19.

With some residents forced to seek refuge in caves, the Government of Vanuatu asked the Australian, New Zealand and American governments for emergency food supplies and other assistance. In accordance, the Royal Australian Air Force (RAAF) dispatched two Hercules transport planes to help with recovery efforts. The first carried a helicopter that transported Vanuatu military forces, medical teams and supplies to the affected northern islands, especially remote villages inaccessible to larger aircraft. The other plane was used to transport more than 16,000 kilograms (35,000 lb) of fuel and relief supplies including food and shelter provisions. The Royal New Zealand Air Force also provided a plane, which transported relief supplies from Espiritu Santo to the northern islands up to three times daily, with the bulk of supplies donated by Australia. The European Commission provided Vanuatu with €100,000 in emergency aid to purchase local foods, including rice, preserved meat, and fish, and to distribute it to Anne's victims. The total cost of relief and reconstruction efforts was estimated between US$1.2–2 million.

Within the Paiti-la-Tonuatua area to the north of Noumea, New Caledonia Air Force helicopters rescued several people who had moved to the roofs of their houses. Despite the severe crop damage, no areas were declared disasters by January 20. The South Pacific division of the Adventist Development and Relief Agency sent AU$5,000 to New Caledonia for relief efforts. Emergency funding of F300,000 was given to New Caledonia to help with the relief effort by the French Minister of the Interior and Minister of Overseas Territories. The European Commission also provided New Caledonia with €85,000, which was distributed by the United Nations High Commissioner for Refugees in the form of cash donations to the worst-affected families. After the season, the name "Anne" was retired by the World Meteorological Organization.

== See also ==
- Cyclone Agi
- Typhoon Roy
