= Weather of 2010 =

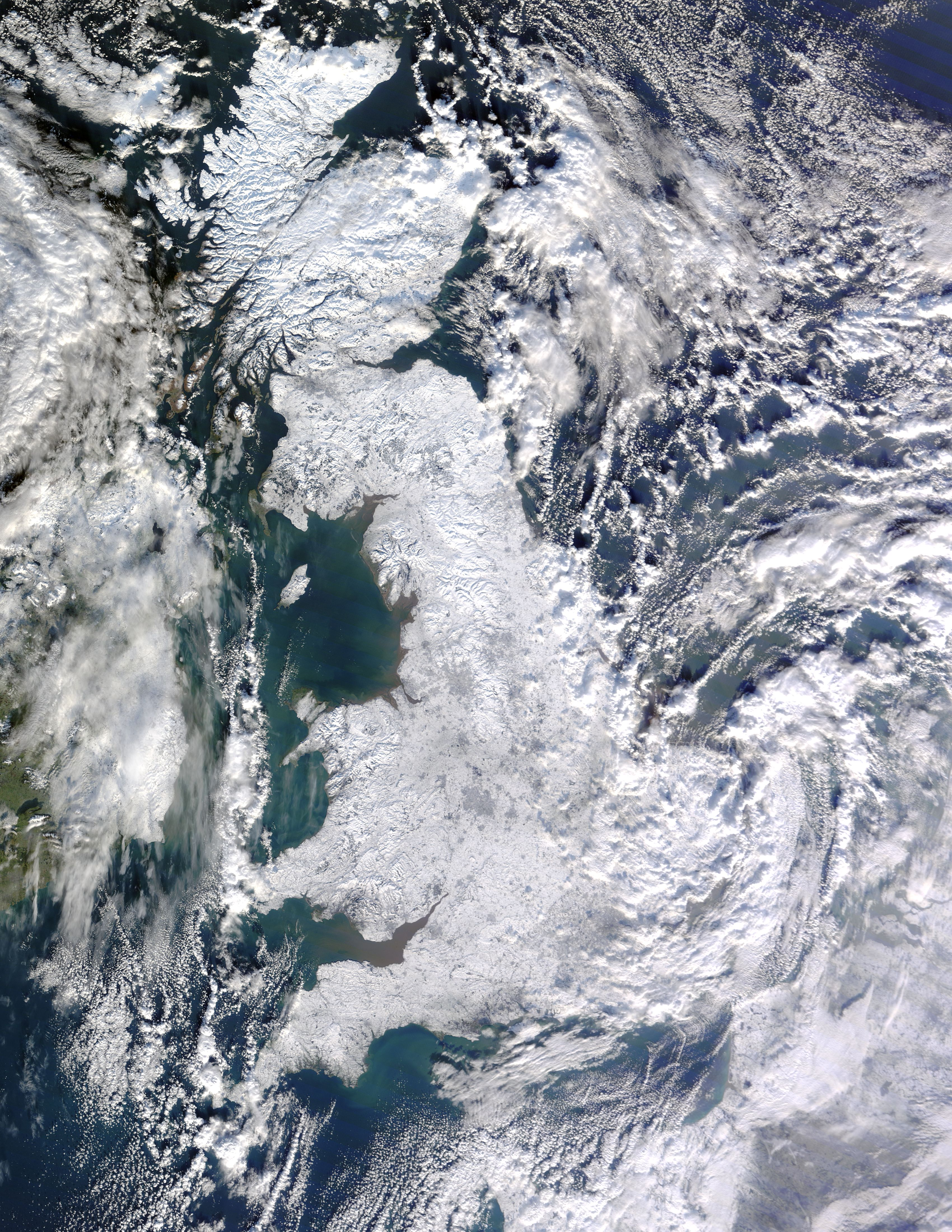
- A satellite photo showing most of the UK. It shows the extent of snow cover across the entire island. From Plymouth in the south to Aberdeen in the north, the UK was hit with the heaviest snowfall in 32 years.

Weather
- Lowest temp: −45.6 °C (−50.1 °F) (Folldal, Norway)

The global weather activity of 2010 includes major meteorological events in the Earth's atmosphere during the year, including winter storms (blizzards, ice storms, European windstorms), hailstorms, out of season monsoon rain storms, extratropical cyclones, gales, microbursts, flooding, rainstorms, tropical cyclones, and other severe weather events.

The thunderstorm season for the Northern Hemisphere began near spring, beginning on March 1, and ended on August 31.

== January ==
=== January 1–3 ===
Overnight snowfall on New Year's Eve and New Year's Day caused disruption in North East England, affecting roads across Northumberland, Tyne and Wear, County Durham and Teesside. Snow also fell in parts of East Cumbria. In places, the snow fell as deep as 10 centimeters (3.9 in). On January 2, a weather front with a northerly wind brought heavy snow to the northwest of England. Wythenshawe, near Manchester Airport, saw 130 millimeters (5 in) of snow. This affected road transport, particularly in the Greater Manchester area, causing the closure of Snake Pass and poor conditions on the M60, M602 and M66.

As a snowstorm entered Scotland, a number of roads across the country were closed, including three junctions of the M9 and the Newbridge Roundabout in Edinburgh. Rail services between Inverness and Central Scotland were also affected by poor weather.

Between January 1 and 2, 2010, 50- and 70-year record low temperatures and snowfall hit northern China and Korea. Blizzards also hit Mongolia's Dundgobi province.

A heavy storm surge hit northeastern New Brunswick on January 2, leading to over $750,000 in damage in the community of Port Elgin.

Heavy record-breaking snow also fell in Moscow in early January 2010 and light snow briefly fell in Greece and Turkey.

Possibly more than 200 people died in northern India, mostly in Uttar Pradesh, after a cold snap and accidents in heavy fog around January 2 and 3.

Heavy rain fell in parts of southwestern Brazil. The worst affected municipality was Angra dos Reis, about 150 kilometers (93 mi) southwest of the city of Rio de Janeiro. At least 35 people were killed at a resort on Ilha Grande after the hotel was buried under a mudslide. In Rio Grande do Sul, at least seven people were dead and 20 missing after a bridge collapsed due to heavy rains. It was reported to be one of the worst mudslides in Rio de Janeiro's history.

=== January 4–5 ===
On January 4, heavy rain fell in Brazil.

Heavy snow fell in northern China and grounded hundreds of flights on the 4th. Beijing was hit by a blizzard starting the evening of the 2nd, with 70–80% of flights canceled out of Beijing Capital International Airport on January 4. Close to 20 cm of snow fell in the north of the city, and close to 25 cm in Seoul. Schools across the area were closed. Continued snowstorms were forecast for the city of Beijing and the province of Inner Mongolia. It was also predicted on January 7 for snow to reach the provinces of Jiangsu, Anhui, Henan and Hubei on January 9 according to China National Radio. One person was killed in Xinjiang Autonomous Region as a result of the storm.

Japan's Hokkaido island was hit by heavier snowfall, causing heavy travel disruption and some airport closures.

By January 4 about 30 people died from cold-related causes in the last 11 days across Bangladesh as snow and a cold wave swept over the north and center of the nation. Freezing fog also occurred on the 4th in Punjab, India. Some parts of Bangladesh were the hardest hit with temperatures plummeting as low as 6 °C.

The New Brunswick villages of Upper Cape and Port Elgin were devastated as a massive hurricane-strength blizzard hit Nova Scotia, New Brunswick and Prince Edward Island on January 4, causing massive blackouts in its wake.

Light snow briefly fell in Lebanon, Jordan, Israel and Palestine and further snow was reported in Niigata, Japan.

Heavy rain and severe cold hit southern Bangladesh and Italy. Italy suffered from both heavy rain in the south and heavy snow in the north.

On the 4th, the UN issued a Green Alert in Albania as northern rivers swell with melt water

In Scotland, Fife Council became the first local authority to confirm that its supply of grit was exhausted on January 4, after it received less than it had ordered from suppliers. Government Ministers denied there was a shortage of grit and salt and insisted there were "very substantial" supplies for Scotland's roads.

January 4 saw four villages in Sakhalin lose power as a result of a storm. The 2,000 strong town of Tomari was worst hit. Blizzard struck Sakhalin island, a narrow island in the stormy Sea of Okhotsk, off the coast of Siberia and just 25 miles north of Japan's snowy Hokkaido island.

On January 4, many motorways in Shandong were closed and 19 flights canceled in the Yantai International Airport.

January 4 saw Seoul's heaviest snowfall since 1937, according to the Korea Meteorological Administration. The blizzard dumped 25.8 centimeters (10.2 in) of snow on the town.

Avalanches and heavy snow hit the Russian's Sakhalin Island, which was smothered by a snow cyclone and blizzard, the Island's emergency officials said.

Civil authorities were put on a major alert in the province of Shandong on January 4 as more snow fell in both Shandong and Beijing. Travel was affected as the snowstorm paralyzed Beijing on January 4, 2010.

Inner Mongolia was still in a critical situation as teams battled to clear severe rural snow drifts.

4–8 inches (10–20 centimeters) of snow fell in Beijing on the 5th, in the largest snowfall since 1951.

2,000 weather modification offices in China were used to bomb the skies with silver iodide to induce rain or snow. Schools in Beijing and Tianjin were closed. The capital received the harshest Siberian winds in decades. Temperatures for the 5th were forecast to plunge to −16 °C, a 40-year record low, after a daytime maximum of −8 °C. The head of the Beijing Meteorological Bureau, Guo Hu, linked the blizzard-like conditions of the first week of January to unusual atmospheric patterns caused by global warming.

Heavy snow started to fall in Seoul, South Korea and it was reported that a leading North Korean Communist party official had frozen to death in his home in Sepo.

On the 4th, many motorways in Shandong were closed and 19 flights were canceled at Yantai International Airport.

In Inner Mongolia, 13 trains were delayed that Monday in Hohhot, the regional capital, according to the Hohhot railway authorities.

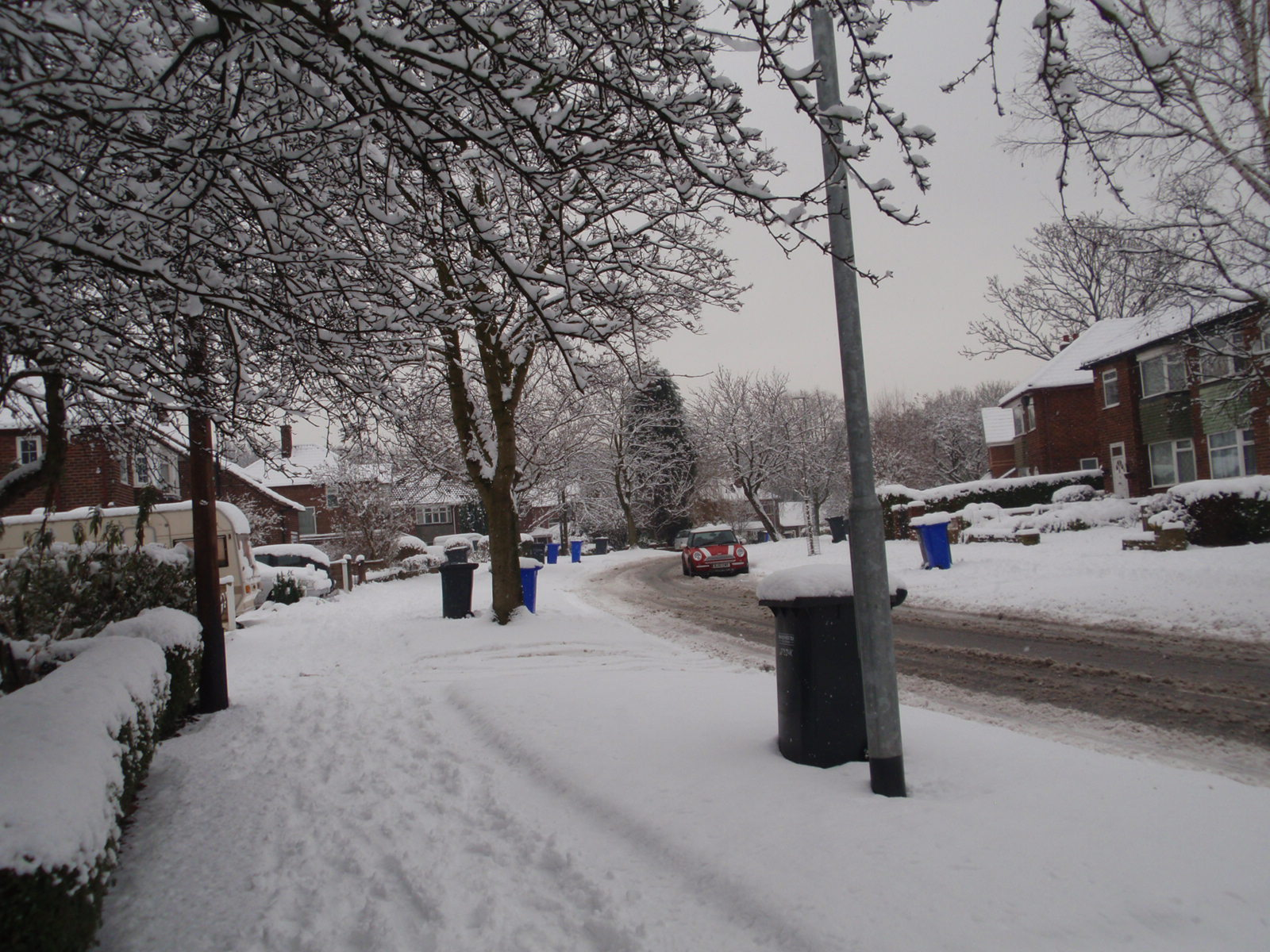
Manchester, England, on January 5

The Met Office issued weather warnings for every region in the UK except the Northern Isles. An extreme weather warning was issued for southern areas for overnight snowfall which could bring accumulations from 25 to 40 centimeters (9.8 to 15.7 in). BBC Weather and the Met Office also warned that temperatures in the Highlands of Scotland could drop to −20 °C (−4 °F) later in the week. The Met Office also confirmed that the UK was experiencing the longest prolonged cold spell since December 1981. The Harrogate district endured over six inches and had been a regular feature on BBC News broadcasts.

A local record of 48 centimetres (19 in) of snow was lying in Aviemore and 0.91 to 1.22 metres (3 to 4 ft) of snow was recorded within the Cairngorms National Park. Most parts of Scotland had further snowfalls during the night of January 4/5.

Due to shortage of road grit conventionally made from rock salt, road grit was being made by or for road-gritters from cooking-type salt mixed with builders' sand; and the public bought up large amounts of cooking salt and table salt to put on their paths and drives. The government was reported to have reallocated reserve supplies of road salt and grit from Oxfordshire and Buckinghamshire and sent it to Cumbria and Fife due to the higher priority of even lower salt and grit reserves, along with the greater snow clearance work, according to Radio Oxford.

A heat wave and/or unforeseen monsoon weather also hit parts of Australia in early 2010. Victoria, the scene of horrific bushfires the year before, had a far colder summer, with hot weather arriving more than a month later than usual in 2009. August 17 saw a dust storm at Laguna Mar Chiquita as a major drought hit Argentina, and flooding and hailstorms hit southeastern Australia and Queensland in March 2010. The lack of winter precipitation in parts of China, however, contributed to a severe drought in the southwest. Bolivia, Venezuela, Mali, Mauritania, Morocco and Spain had also seen periods of drought in 2009 and 2010. On between May 12 and 26, both Mauritania, the Sénégal River Area and neighboring parts of both Senegal and Mali faced both a drought and famine in 2010.

=== January 6–9 ===
Snow and fog occurred in Germany from January 3 to 10. The Finnish railways and Helsinki airport were disrupted by further snowfall and record low temperatures for the Helsinki region.

On January 6, the London Borough of Harrow closed 58 schools. 73 flights were canceled after 3 cm of snow fell at Heathrow Airport.

Continued snowstorms were forecast for the city of Beijing and the province of Inner Mongolia. Electricity rationing started on January 7. Snow started falling in Gangsu province on January 7 ad reached the provinces of Jiangsu, Anhui, Henan and Hubei on January 9. One person was killed in Xinjiang Autonomous Region as a result of the storm.

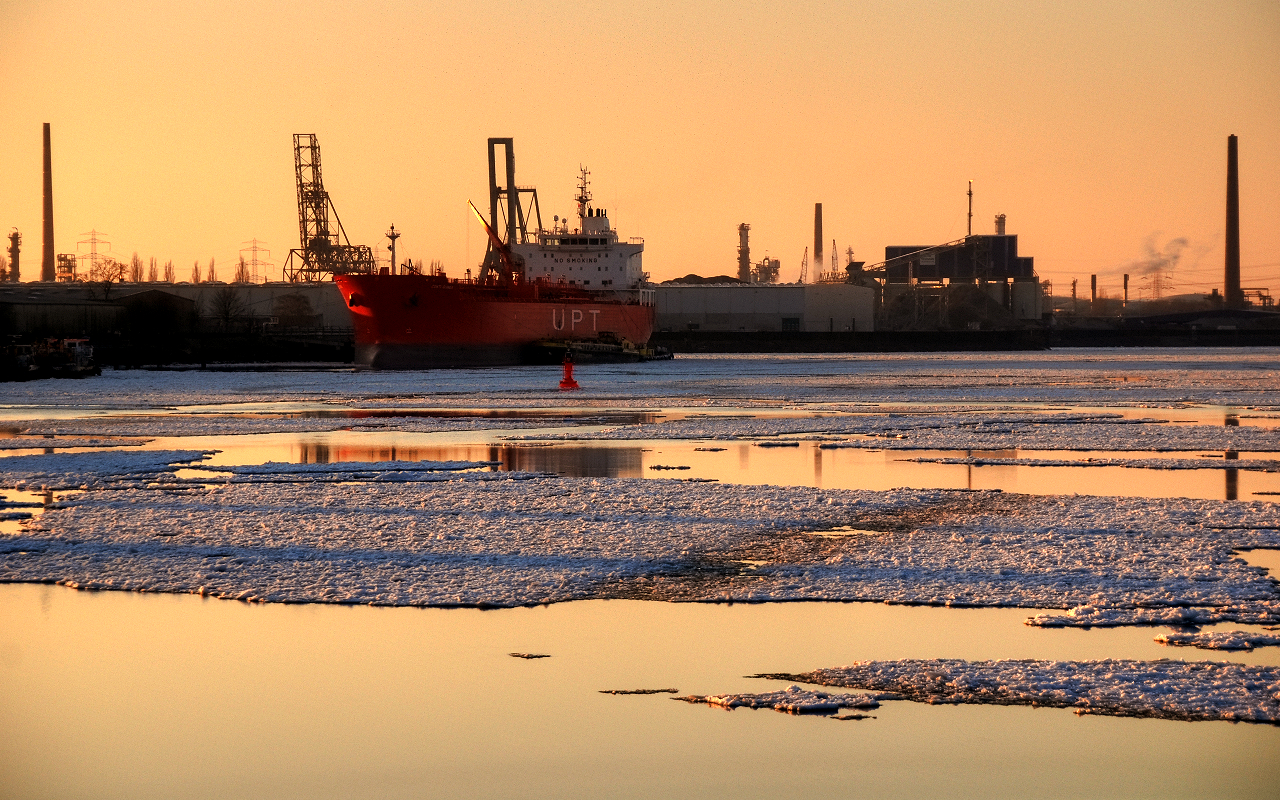
Port of Hamburg, Germany, on January 6

The synoptic situation in northern Europe settled to a steady northeast wind which brought snow showers and belts of snow.

The British Army had to help stranded motorists in southern areas. The Met Office confirmed that 40 centimetres (16 in) of snow fell in some parts of southern England. A "severe" warning issued by the Met Office was in place for every region in the UK. Scottish First Minister Alex Salmond said Scotland was experiencing its worst winter since 1963. Further deaths in Wales, Shetland and Aberdeenshire were recorded. Roads in the southeast were left with long traffic jams and abandoned cars. 8,000 schools were closed.

In Eastern Parts, there were accumulations of 40 cm to 50 cm in places. In Kent, six inches of snow fell in four hours in the early evening. By January 7, 2010, 22 people had died in the UK because of the freezing conditions.

Heavy snow blocked many roads in the Irish Republic. Dublin Airport closed on January 6 and again on January 9. Cork Airport closed on January 10. Dublin Bus canceled all services for a time. Ireland West Airport was also closed. A new Irish record low temperature of −9 °C (16 °F) was recorded in Dublin, Ireland. Temperatures in County Limerick dropped to −11.1 °C (12.0 °F). Varying amounts of snow fell across Ireland on the 7th and 8th and road salt reserves began to run low.

The snow fell heavily in some places of Spain including Prades (Tarragona, southern Catalonia) which received 120 cm of snow after a storm lasting over 30 hours. The BBC News reported heavy snowfall as far south as Granada, in Spain.

25 people, mostly children, died as a blizzard swept over most of Nepal on January 7.

Heavy snow also fell in Chicago on the 7th

In Norway, temperatures hit −42 °C (−44 °F) on the 7th in the village of Folldal as snow fell across Scandinavia and −42.4 °C (−44.3 °F) at Tynset. on the 8th as Kuusamo in Finland, the lowest registered temperature was −37.1 °C (−34.8 °F). Heavy blizzards and snow storms raged across Germany, Scandinavia and the northwestern parts of European Russia.

In Poland, more snow hit the Lower Silesian Voivodeship, and nine people died across the country in a 48-hour period, bringing the total weather-related deaths to 139 since the start of November, a police spokesman said.

Switzerland's 24.5-kilometre (15.2 mi) Gotthard Road Tunnel reopened to trucks on the 8th, following heavy snowfalls over the previous 2 days.

A heavy and snowy cyclone hit the Aleutian Islands on January 7 and 8. Snow accompanied a cold wave moving south through North America on January 8, and Mexico City received snowfall accumulations. In the mountainous regions, temperatures dropped to −10 °C, killing nine people. The snow continued to fall on the 10th. Bitter weather may have wiped out some Alaskan reindeer as temperatures and snow depths exceeded those of the extraordinarily harsh winter of 1963 to 1964.

January 7 saw the snow and ice continuing to affect the counties of Oxfordshire, Warwickshire, Buckinghamshire, Gloucestershire and Northamptonshire. Many Oxfordshire locations had between 1 and 2 ft of unmelted snow. Cherwell District Council workers began using a mixture of table salt and sand instead of their diminishing road grit and rock salt supplies.

Record overnight temperature lows of −22.3 °C (−8.1 °F) were recorded in Altnaharra, Caithnessshire, in the Scottish Highlands on the 7th. as another area of low pressure over the North Sea started bringing further fronts of snow over the east of Great Britain on January 7, accompanied with cold, easterly winds. The snow continued in to the 9th and the UK almost ran out of road salt, rock salt, table salt and road grit supplies due to the heavy demand from various agencies and local government bodies.

By January 7, 2010, twenty-two people had officially died in the UK because of the freezing conditions. The Department of Health wildly overestimated that the cold weather could cause up to 40,000 excess deaths in the UK if it continued much longer. 122 people had already died in Poland, most of them reportedly homeless and 11 had died in Romania. Deaths in Bosnia and Austria luckily stood at only 4, with Kosovo only losing 1 life so far.

The heavy snowfall across the British Isles between January 6 to 9, resulted in large-scale traffic disruption, closed airports, many canceled trains and hundreds of school closures. A polar low developing in the English Channel brought fronts of snow over southern England before moving south and dissipating. Two middle-aged men died after falling into a frozen lake in Leicester, in the English Midlands. 27 major companies in Britain were ordered to halt using gas on the 9th in order to maintain supplies amid unprecedented levels of demand and major companies had their gas turned off on the 8th, in the first such move since 2003, although there was no immediate danger for households of supplies running out. The Automobile Association, a motor vehicle breakdown service, said they had dealt with about 340,000 breakdowns since December 17, including a local government snow plough that had overturned after it had hit black ice near Huddersfield. Several thousand schools remained closed and several of the weekend's Premier League football matches were canceled.

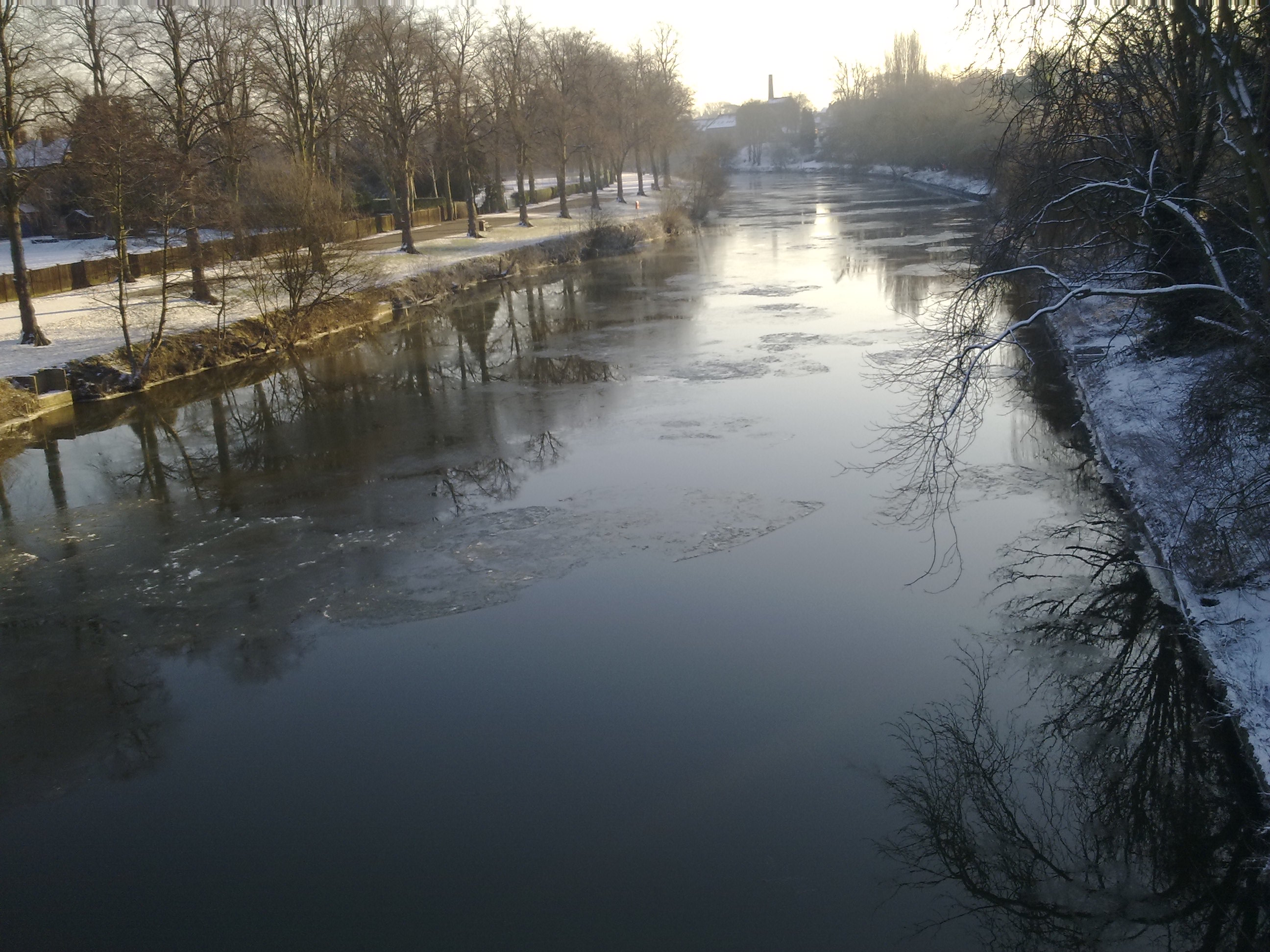
Ice on River Severn at Shrewsbury, England on January 8

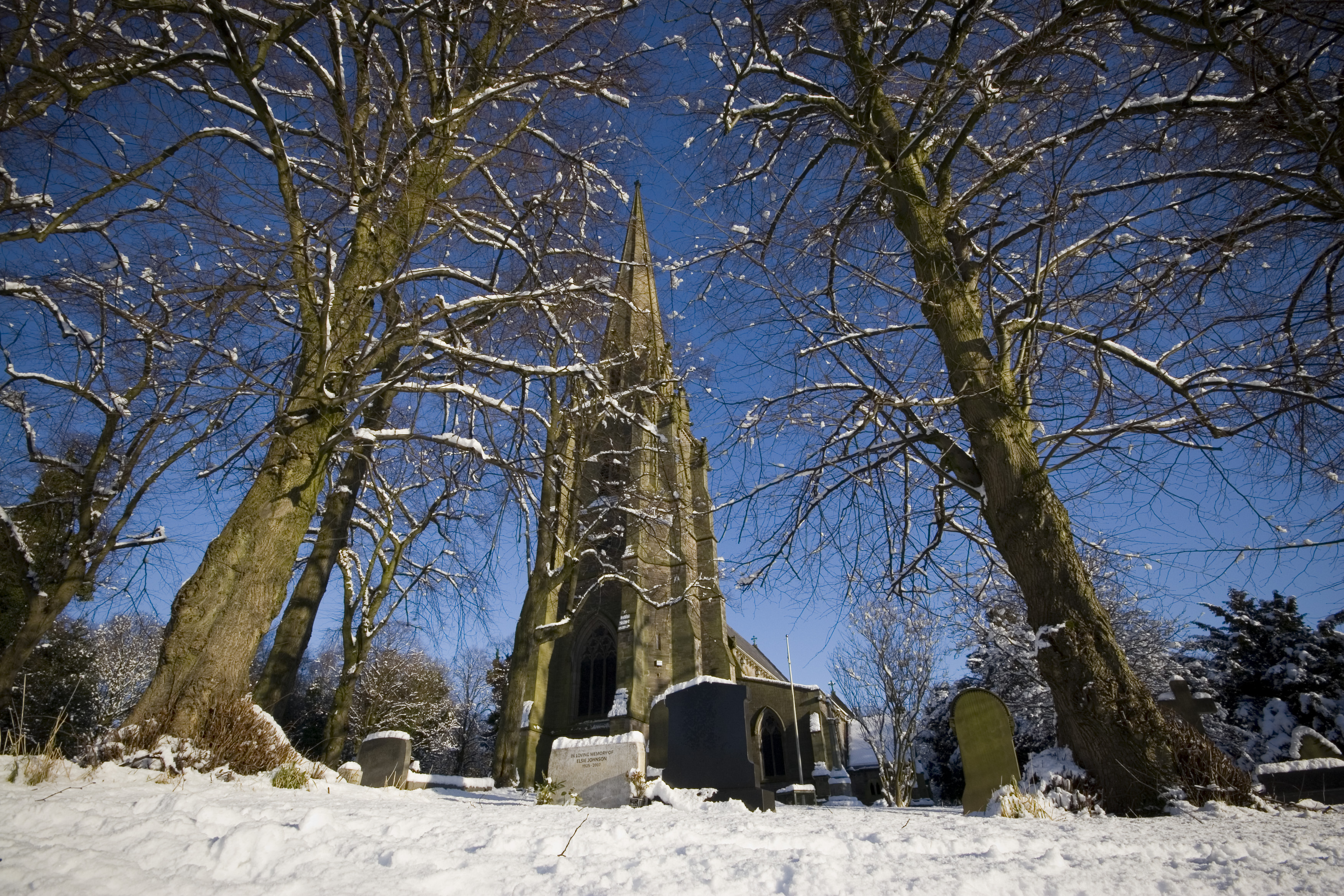
Worsley, Greater Manchester, England, on January 8

Overnight temperatures of −22.3 °C (−8.1 °F) were recorded in Altnaharra in the Scottish Highlands. Heavy snow fell in the North of England throughout the day giving significant accumulations. A high of −7.7 °C was recorded at Tulloch Bridge.

Heavy snow fell in Denmark on January 8. By the evening of January 8, the Rügen Islands off the northeast coast of Germany was covered, on average, in 30 centimeters of snow while the capital Berlin was carpeted with snow and ice. Autoclub Europa warned that chaotic traffic conditions could potentially leave large parts of Germany completely paralyzed as the country prepared for further freezing conditions as forecasters warned that temperatures would drop below −20 degrees Celsius (−4 degrees Fahrenheit) overnight. German officials had also acknowledged a shortage of grit and fear that high winds and drifting snow had closed may German autoroutes and roads, along with parts of Frankfurt airport. As shortages in road salt and grit were already being feared, while the authorities recommended that people consider stocking up with a few days' worth of food and water. The A5 autoroute leading from Baden-Württemberg into France was closed on Friday afternoon, leading to a queue of hundreds of lorries building up. The road was opened again on Saturday morning. Snow was also proving to be a major problem in Saxony and the Rhineland. The country's nature protection group N.A.B.U. recommended that people put out food for birds since the cold and snowy weather had ruined their usual feeding patterns.

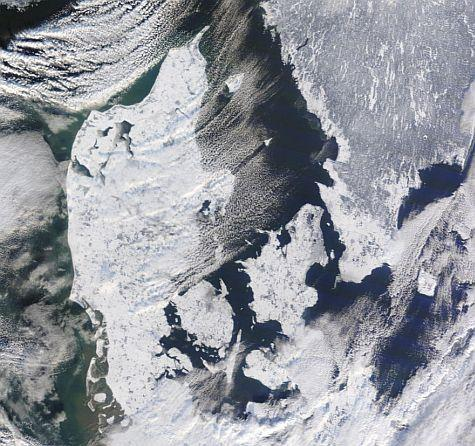
A snow-covered Denmark on January 8

Meanwhile, some light snow also fell in Kosovo, Udmurtia and Ryazan Oblast, but heavier snow fell in many parts of Ukraine. Temperatures fell as low as −30 °C and −29 °C in parts of Ukraine and similar temperatures occurred in neighboring parts of Russia. Heavy snow hit Moscow on the 9th.

A new wave of heavy snow was first reported central and northern France on January 9, with the Cotentin Peninsula and Paris being the worst-affected. The French government said all non-essential travel should be avoided in these localities. Significant snowfalls caused major delays to train services, blocked roads and some 15,000 people in areas around city of Arles experienced power outages as power lines collapsed under the weight of snow. Airlines canceled a quarter of flights from Charles de Gaulle airport. Road salt and grit supplies ran low in some districts due to their unexpectedly heavy use.

=== January 10–11 ===
Heavy rain and melt water caused the worst floods in Albania in nearly 50 years during the 2010 Albanian floods, and over 2,500 homes were evacuated. An artificial lake in the Kosinj Valley overflowed after it rose by 8 centimeters in one hour. The worst hit area in Albania was the Shkodra district.

On January 10, Croatia declared a national flood emergency as the Neretva River reached near-record high levels, flooding the town of Metković. Northern Croatia also got flooded in related storm system. Heavy hailstorms also hit the Dubrovnik that day.

Snow hit the Czech Republic on January 10.

During the early hours of January 10, light snow showers spread across parts of Central England and Wales. The maximum temperature was −13.5 °C (7.7 °F) in Altnaharra and low of −18.4 °C (−1.1 °F) was recorded at Kinbrace. On the 11th rain, sleet and snow traveled northwards throughout the early hours. Allenheads in England had fears over a potential 4.6 m (15 ft) snowdrift. A low of −21.0 °C (−5.8 °F) was recorded in Altnaharra in Highland Region.

More than 300 flights were cancelled on 10 and 11 January at Germany's Frankfurt Airport. All three runways were cleared and being used by 12 January despite light snow falls that day.

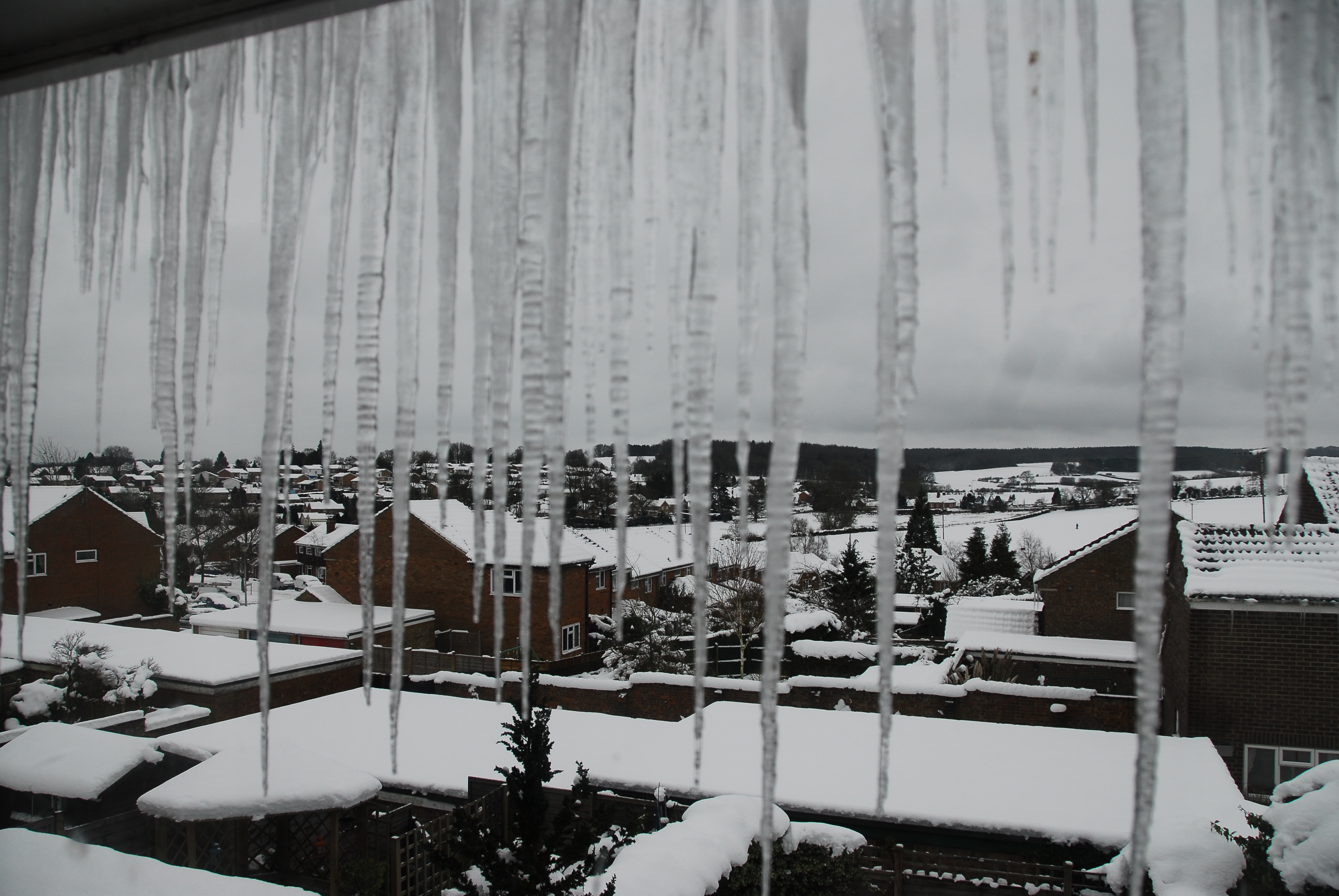
Icicles in Alton, England, on January 10

The snowstorms and blizzards of 11 January brought widespread travel chaos to Germany, Austria, Switzerland and Hungary. Airports, Motorways and railways were closed en masse due to heavy snow and ice. Lithuania, Latvia, Estonia, Finland, Liechtenstein, the Czech Republic and Slovakia also reported some snowfall.

January 10 saw heavy snow fall in Chicago.

On January 10, Los Angeles Mayor Antonio Villaraigosa canceled a trip to Washington to monitor L.A.'s response to the Southern California rainstorms.

Freezing rain storms battered parts of Sichuan, Yunnan and Hubei, killing dozens of people. On January 10, 1 person died and 5,435 were evacuated after a snowstorm in Xinjiang Uygur Autonomous Region according to the Ministry of Civil Affairs. A total of 261,800 people in 12 counties or cities were affected by the blizzards.

On January 11, intense snowstorms hit a still beleaguered Europe. Many cars and a lorry were stuck in drifting snow near the northern German town of Soehlen. The German transport ministry warned people to travel on essential journey only. Polish authorities reported that there were about 140 hypothermia deaths in Poland, that nearly 50,000 Polish residents without electricity, that the PKP trains were delayed by as much as 9 hours and that most of Poland's homeless shelters were overflowing. A similar situation was also occurring in the shops and homeless shelters of the Czech Republic. Snow also fell in Belarus.

Coal supplies ran low at power plants as the death toll rose to two in the strong snowstorm in the Altai and temperatures fell to −40 °C on January 12.

=== January 12–14 ===
On January 12, heavy snow caused hundreds of accidents, halted flights, and downed power lines in Poland. More than 160 people were trapped overnight on a frozen stretch of German roadway. Hundreds of road accidents were also reported in Germany over the weekend, especially along the Baltic Coast. Austria, Switzerland and Liechtenstein were also badly hit by snowy and freezing conditions.

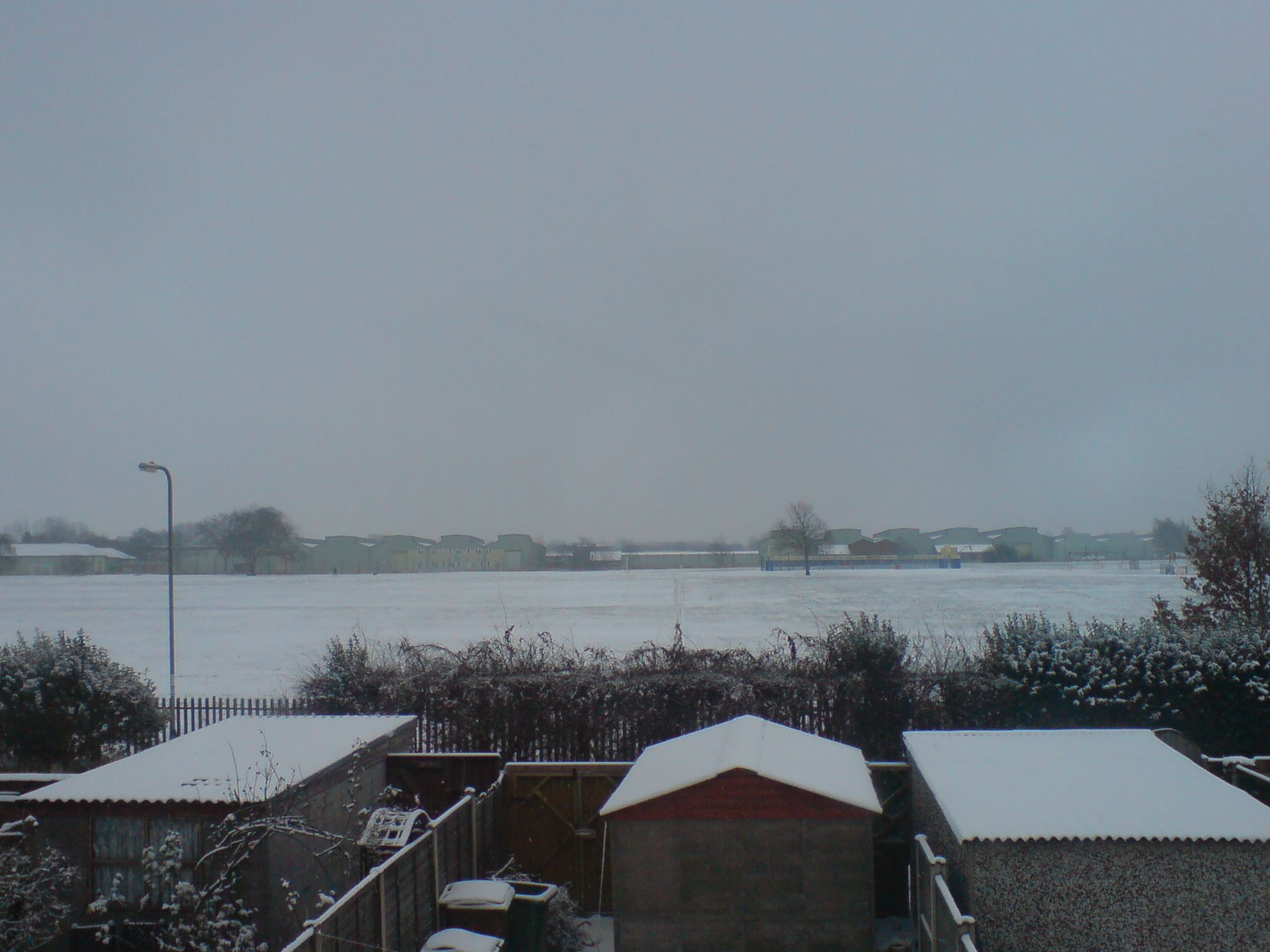
Snow in Stafford, England, on January 12

Heavy snowfall continued for a second day in Aberdeenshire, Aberdeen and Rutland.

A further 5 to 10 cm of snow fell across the UK during the midday of January 12, including Stafford in Staffordshire. Many schools were once again closed across England and Wales. There were many road accidents and closures; the M25 motorway was down to one lane between Leatherhead and Reigate whilst roads stretching right across southern Great Britain were untreated causing havoc for commuters. Gatwick and Birmingham airports were closed and many flights were delayed at Heathrow.

A picture of Banbury road's pot-holes during 2010. The Banbury Cake and the Banbury Review newspapers did an exposé on the weather-induced potholes during the second week of January 2010. They were filled in by May 2010 after media pressure. The filled-in one is from 2011.

During January 13, the weather system continued north affecting much of Northern England before reaching Scotland. On January 14, southerly to south-easterly winds brought bands of snow to northern parts of Britain. About 440 Welsh schools were either fully or partially closed on Thursday the 14th. The English snowfall began to ease on the 14th and the British government ordered an inquiry into the road salt and grit shortage scandal crisis, travel disruption and the poor handling of the disaster by various British companies and agencies. As the thaw took hold in the UK and France, rain began to fall across the UK.

It was revealed on the 14th that all of the British county councils, London boroughs and unitary authorities were advised by the government to have six days' supplies of road salt in 2009. Up to 30 councils rejected last year's offer of thousands of tonnes of de-icing salt at a reduced price, to use on the roads this winter according to the BBC. The British Salt Director David Stephen made an offer out of the firm's 60,000 tonnes stockpile at Middlewich, Cheshire, in April 2009, but virtually no one to take up the offer. Many councils nearly ran out of salt. Scotland, Cumbria, Northumbria and Northern Ireland received priority access to salt due to the severity of the local landscape and storm activity.

There were also road closures in Ceredigion including the A4120 at Ponterwyd, and the A4086 at Nant Peris in Gwynedd had been shut down due to hazardous driving conditions. Schools in Caerphilly and Rhondda Cynon Taf either were fully or partially shut. Wales' Education Minister Leighton Andrews, Welsh First Minister Carwyn Jones and the WJEC exam board helped organize the Welsh GCSEs and A-level exam locations.

Temperatures of +43.6C were reported in parts of Australia as a heat wave hit most of the country. Heavy rain also fell in parts of Indonesia and Queensland, Australia.

=== January 15–18 ===
As the snow cleared from the United States, the British Isles and Europe, rain began to fall in place on the 14th and the snow also began to relent in both China, Korea and Japan on the 15th.

Met Office severe weather warnings covered Wales and western parts of England and Scotland and snow was forecast for the Pennines and Scottish and Welsh hills. The Environment Agency warned about flooding in some areas of England and Wales. BBC weather forecaster Sarah Keith-Lucas warned of localized flooding in western parts of the UK caused by melting snow, rain and gale-force winds.

Later, the Environment Agency warned that heavy rain and snow melting in slightly warmer temperatures meant that there was a risk of some localized flooding from drains, especially in Wales and parts of England. They issued flood warnings for possible isolated river flooding in these areas, as heavy rain moved in from the south west on Friday evening. The Met Office and said heavy rain would move in from the west accompanied by strong to gale-force winds on Saturday. The Scottish Environment Protection Agency had five flood watches underway. Thames Valley Police warned motorists about surface flooding and aquaplaning on Oxfordshire's roads.

The 15th brought rain and thawing to Scotland, southwest England and Greater Manchester. Flood warnings were issued.

On January 17, the Environment Agency issued flood warnings. Melting snow, heavy rain and frozen ground caused flooding in England, Scotland and Wales. In Scotland, a landslide led to the temporally closure of the A76 in Dumfries and Galloway, while a section of the M74 was shut temporally shut due to flooding. Many properties in Maesteg, Bridgend, Ebbw Vale and Monmouth were also flooded. The River Wye, River Dee, River Cherwell, and River Severn were all in full flood.

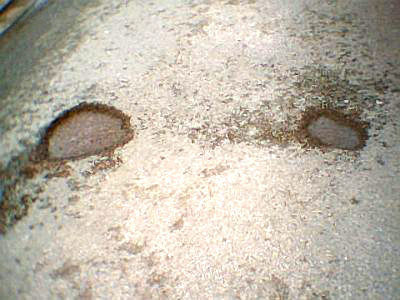
The Banbury Cake and The Banbury Review newspapers did an exposé on the weather-induced potholes during the second week of January 2010.

Severn Trent Water, which provides water to central England and parts of Wales, said it had drafted in extra staff as ruptured and frozen pipes began to thaw.

=== January 17–23 ===
From January 17 to January 23, 2010, a series of five powerful Pineapple Express (atmospheric river) winter storms bore down on Southern California, before moving eastward on January 22. On January 19, the fourth storm impacted Santee, California. On the afternoon of January 19, the National Weather Service issued tornado warnings for San Diego County, as potentially tornadic thunderstorms crossed the area.

As the fifth and second-strongest of the week's storms slammed into California on January 20, officials predicted as much as four feet (1.2 metres) of snowfall in Northern California. On January 20, more than 500 homes were evacuated as floods hit parts of California, as up to 6 inches (15 centimeters) of rain fell in the state. Rare tornado warnings were issued in parts of Southern California, including southern Los Angeles, Long Beach, Southeastern San Diego County, and Anaheim. Flash flood watches covered Los Angeles, Santa Barbara, and Ventura Counties. On January 20, an EF-0 tornado was reported in Southeastern San Diego County, which lasted for 1 minute, 30 seconds. Jim Rouiller, the senior energy meteorologist at Planalytics Inc., said that the storms were the worst series of storms the state had experienced since 1997 (when a series of powerful storms caused the New Year's Day 1997 Northern California Flood). On January 21, the sixth storm broke the record of the lowest pressure recorded in parts of California and Oregon. Rouiller expected that evening's storm to bring from 4 to 12 inches of rain, severe mudslides, a few tornadoes, and heavy mountain snow ranging from 6 to 15 feet across the Sierra Nevada mountain range.

California state water officials warned on January 21 that one week of heavy rain and snow was not enough to end the drought, which was entering its fourth year by 2010, though the precipitation from the storms had significantly reduced the severity of the drought.

On January 22, the sixth storm caused heavy rainfall and additional flooding in parts of Los Angeles. 500 people were evacuated from a small village in La Paz County, Arizona due to a flash flood. Freshly fallen snow blanketed the north side of the San Gabriel Mountains and many other parts of California on January 23 after the sixth storm had left. During that week, the storms dropped 20 cm (8 in) to 25 cm (10 in) of rain in Los Angeles.

In California, the storms dropped a maximum total of 51 centimetres (20 in) of rain in the higher elevations of the Sierra Nevada, while a maximum total of 230 centimetres (90 in) of snow was recorded at Mammoth Lakes. Sustained winds of 74 mph (119 km/h) were recorded, while wind gusts up to 94 mph (151 km/h) were measured. In Arizona, the storms dropped a maximum total of 129 centimetres (50.7 in) of snow at Flagstaff. Near Wikieup, the Big Sandy River crested at 5.5 metres (17.9 ft), breaking the previous record of 5.0 metres (16.4 ft) previously set in Match 1978.

The sixth storm brought snow across the Great Plains and as far east as Pennsylvania and New Jersey. Overall, the storms killed at least 10 people, and caused more than $3 million (2010 USD) in damages.

=== January 19–30 ===
On January 19, heavy rain fell in Oxfordshire and King's Sutton, causing some flooding. The River Cherwell nearly flooded Banbury and parts of Oxford. Light snow fell in the Pennines on January 19.

On January 20, heavy rainstorms wreaked havoc in Haifa, Israel, as snow covered Mount Hermon in the Israeli-occupied Golan Heights.

Both Wakehurst Place, near Ardingly, West Sussex and Bedgebury Pinetum, near Lamberhurst in Kent, were damaged. Iain Parkinson, Wakehurst's woodland and conservation manager who had worked on the estate for 23 years, said it was the worst storm he had ever seen in the park.

A new snow storm came over the Peter the Great Gulf, near Vladivostok on January 21. The Onland Mountains and Sikhote-Alin Mountains were buried in snow as the weather system swept through Primorsky and Khabarovsk Krais, Russia. Lake Khanka froze over and was then covered in snow. The ice on the lake was reported to be several inches thick and the snow was spreading into China's Heilongjiang province.

Heavy rain fell in Oxfordshire, Warwickshire and Leicestershire as light snow fell in the Pennines on the 22nd.

The snowstorm that began on Friday night, the 22nd also hit parts of Bulgaria. Power, gas and water cuts occurred in Istanbul. In Turkey's western region, near the Greek and Bulgarian borders, villages were cut off and all major roads were blocked by heavy snow. Bulgarian authorities urged people to avoid travel. Dozens of stranded cars and trucks were abandoned due to heavy snow in eastern Bulgaria and a train was trapped near the border with Romania.

Four people died on the 24th and 25th as snowstorms hit Turkey, and at least 22 people died due to extremely cold temperatures in Romania from January 20 to 25.

From late 2009 through early 2010, a series of massive snow and ice storms that swept the Dakotas caused a number of Indian Reservations to lose power, heat, and running water for an extended period of time. The storms were most severe in Ziebach and Dewey counties, South Dakota. The heavy snow, ice storms and low temperatures of January 25 and 26 led the closure of parts of Interstate 90 and Interstate 29.

Power outages began with a storm in December knocking down around 5,000 power poles, and were accelerated by an ice storm on January 22 knocking down another 3,000 power lines on the reservation. Among the tribes of South Dakota affected were the Cheyenne River Sioux, Crow Creek Sioux Tribe, Flandreau Santee Sioux Tribe, Lower Brule Sioux Tribe, Rosebud Sioux Tribe, Sisseton-Wahpeton Oyate and Standing Rock Sioux Tribe. The reservations were further buffeted by the February 5–6, 2010 North American blizzard, which further depleted foodstocks and exacerbated the power problems.

=== January 28–31 ===
On January 28, floods tore through the River Dnieper's and Prypiat River's floodplains. Weather forecasters said that the abnormal winter in Ukraine had seen severe snowfalls being replaced with long-lasting frosts and temperatures as low as −30 °C.

On January 28, blizzards and severe sub-zero temperatures that killed more than a million livestock in Mongolia forced thousands of herders to migrate to shantytowns near the capital city of Ulan Bator. Extreme winter weather that began in December and followed a hard summer drought that prevented farmers from stockpiling food for their livestock. Dangerously heavy snow and temperatures as low as −40 °C affected 19 of Mongolia's 21 provinces, with more than 14,000 Mongolian and Chinese Red Cross volunteers across the region scrambling to deliver emergency food aid to impoverished herders who had lost nearly all their cattle.

The extreme weather had killed more than one million livestock, the herders' main source of income, according to the National Emergency Management Agency on the 29th. The bad weather had also reduced food security, intensified poverty and increased domestic rural-urban migration for many families. The weather became rather extreme as 80 percent of Mongolia's territory was covered by snow, with depths of 20 to 90 centimeters.

The State Emergency Commission issued an appeal to Mongolia's people to launch a campaign to offer aid to herders and called for the international community to donate food, medicines and equipment as well as funds to help herders. Most cattle in Adaatsag county of Dundgovi Province (Central Gobi), Mongolia died of hypothermia on the 30th. Fuel supplies were also running low.

Heavy snow fell in the German Rhineland on the 30th and 31st. Travel chaos was widespread as the snow spread into Hungary and the rest of Germany.

January 30 and 31 saw heavy snow storms hit the East Coast of the United States and the Sierra Nevada of California. A nor'easter dumped tons of snow over much of central and eastern parts of the United States. The nor'easter unleashed heavy snow over the Central United States, and left some places with over 38 centimetres (15 in) of snow. It then moved eastward and turned up the coast of America, and left some places with over 12 inches of snow on January 30,. Rain and floods also hit Southern California. 6 inches of rain and temperatures of 15 °C were recorded at Long Beach and L.A. on the 31st.

== February ==
=== February 1–4 ===
On February 1, the Chinese government aid arrived in Mongolia and included 10 million Yuan's (1.46 million U.S. dollars') worth of food, portable power generators and quilts. It was said to be the worst snow storms in both Mongolia and Inner Mongolia in at least 30 years. Aid was also sent from the Red Cross Society of China and Kazakhstan. Mongolia formally requested aid from the United Nations on the 2nd, after the extreme cold had killed an estimated 3% of the nation's 44,000,000 head of cattle.

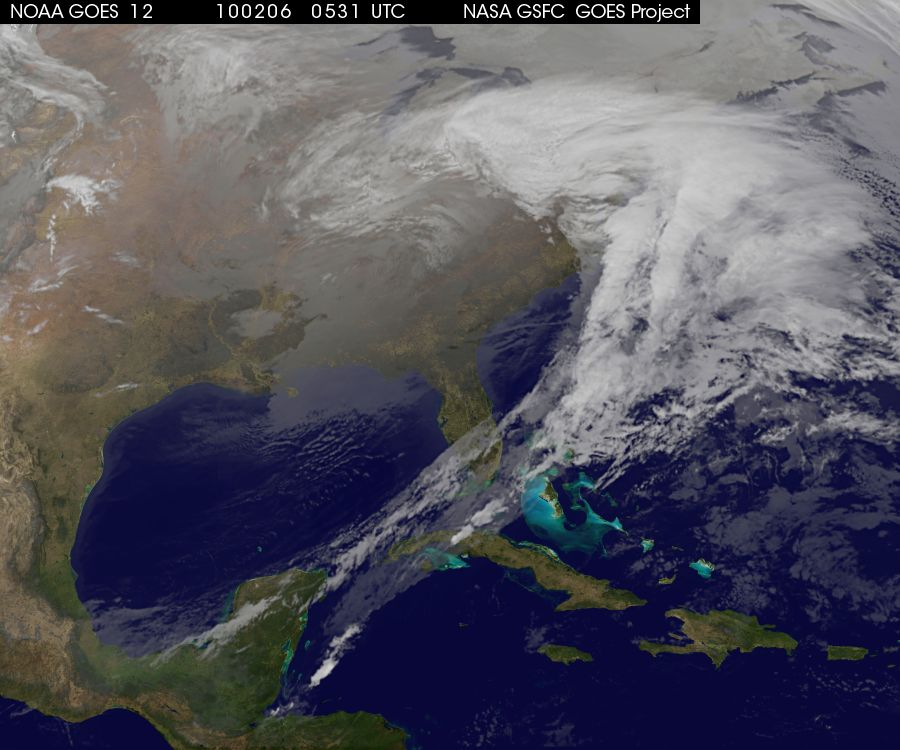
North American blizzard of 2010, imaged by NOAA GOES 12 on February 6, 2010, at 0531 UTC

On February 1, utility crews were working overtime to get power back to the 14,000 residents of Cheyenne River Sioux Reservation. The wind chill factor averaged about −25° and there was about 1-foot of snow on the ground on average.

February 1 saw the earlier Californian storm track its way through northern Mexico and New Mexico. It hit the east coast and caused chaos in the Washington, D.C., Virginia and Maryland areas by February 6.

A cyclone and heavy rain-induced floods hit the Canary islands on February 1 and 2. An unusual event dropped 82 mm of rain and flooded out 27,000 homes over a 24-hour period. The average February rainfall is only 36 millimeters.

February 4 saw the worst winter in Beijing in 50 years, and the worst in Seoul in 70 years. The snow and frost activity was proving to be exceptionally bad that winter across northern India. Official reports suggest that the states of Punjab, Bihar, Haryana and Uttar Pradesh had borne the brunt of the freezing temperatures in India.

Officials at Canada's Vancouver Games were also worried about the lack of snow and frost as the city experienced its warmest January ever as the temperature never went below −2 °C. The average daily high and low for January 2010 was 9.7 and 4.3 °C at the airport, which was way above the average high of 5 °C and the average low of −1 °C for January. No snow was also recorded in January compared to an average of about 17 cm and an average snow depth of 1 cm.

The east coast had records various record low temperatures in southern states such as Georgia, Alabama and Florida in the US. The eastern seaboard, had like the Western Seaboard also suffered one of the worst winters on record. An already snow bound Washington, D.C., was expected to receive up to another 20 inches of snow that weekend. Snow was also threatening the American football championship event known as the Super Bowl.

=== February 5–11 ===
The second big snowstorm of the winter hammered the Washington, D.C., area on February 5. The El Niño phenomenon was blamed for the unusually high sea surface temperatures in the Pacific Ocean that moved east, thus pulling rainfall along with it. Normally, El Niño brings increased rainfall across the east-central and eastern Pacific, leading to drier than normal conditions over northern Australia, Indonesia and the Philippines.

The storm created historic snowfall totals in the Middle Atlantic states, rivaling the Knickerbocker Storm of 1922, as well as extensive flooding and landslides in Mexico. The blizzard stretched from Mexico and New Mexico to New Jersey, killing forty-one people in Mexico, New Mexico, Maryland, Virginia and other places along its track.

Some places across Eastern West Virginia, Maryland, Northern Virginia, Washington, D.C., and Delaware were buried in between 2 and 3 feet (0.61 and 0.91 m) of snow, causing air, rail, and Interstate highway travel to come to a halt. On February 6, authorities said about 4 inches of rain fell in Hollywood Hills and 3.2 inches in Santa Barbara.

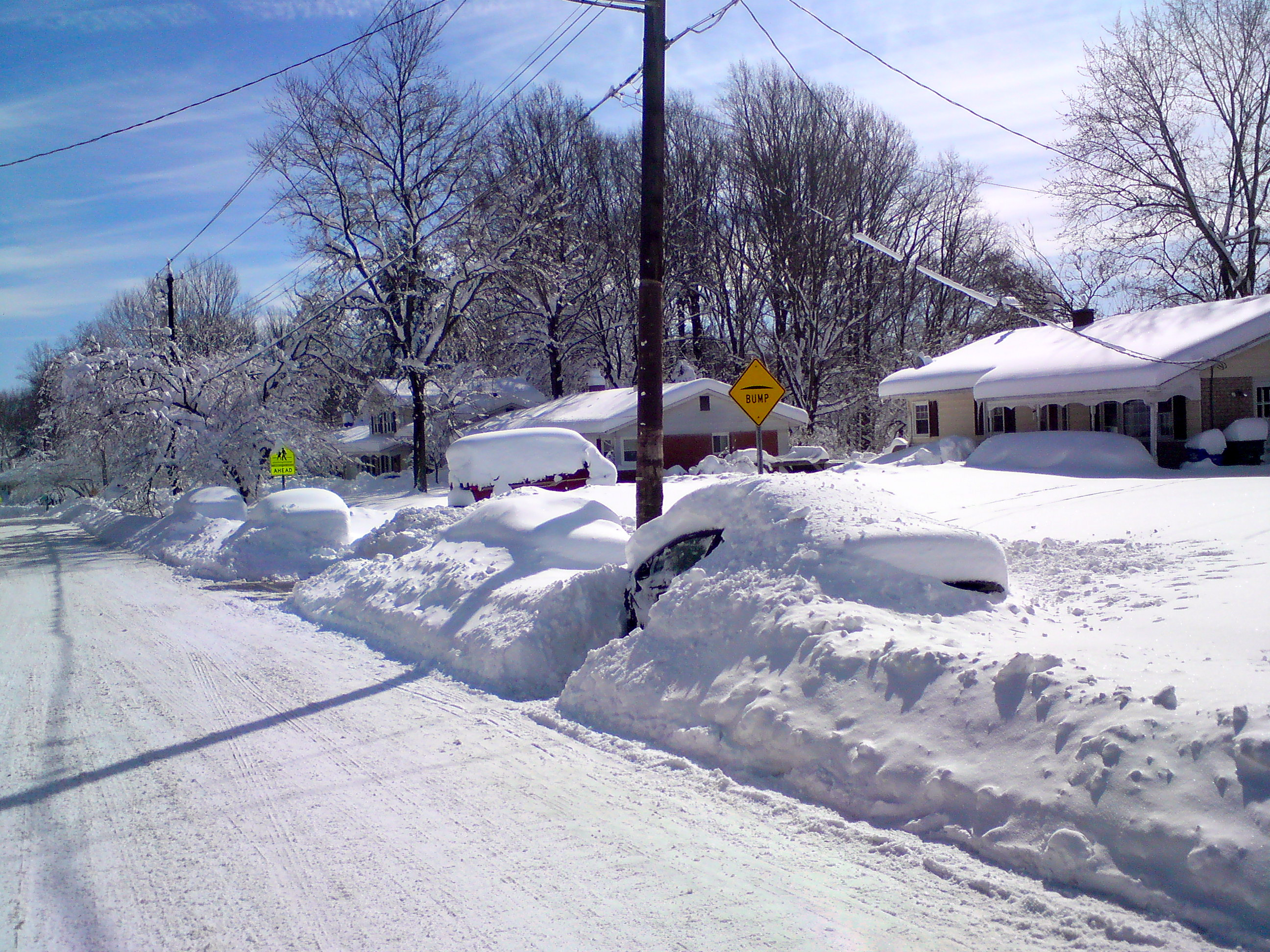
In Rockville, Maryland, cars were buried under more than 51 centimetres (20 in) of snow by 8:45 am EST on February 6.

The snow storms of February 6 and 7 left record levels of snow in many cities. Approximately 61 cm (2 ft) of snow had fallen by midday on Saturday. The mayor of Washington, D.C., and the governors of Virginia and Maryland declared states of emergency as the storm hit both Washington, D.C., Virginia, Maryland, West Virginia, Delaware, Pennsylvania and New Jersey. Amtrak canceled several trains between New York and Washington, D.C., and also between Washington, D.C., and some southern destinations. Many power outages were also reported in the city.

February 7 saw yet more major power outages in the Washington, D.C. region. At least 420,000 homes were under a blackout as the snow felled trees and cut power lines. Some 300,000 homes were without electricity in Maryland and neighboring Virginia, while Washington, D.C., was reporting an initial figure of 100,000 power outages for that day. Emergency workers struggled to restore power as 61 cm (2 ft) of snow and a record snowfall of 91 cm (3 ft) fell on Maryland. Transport was badly disrupted from West Virginia to southern New Jersey. Washington, D.C., Virginia and Maryland declared a short term state of emergency, allowing them to activate the National Guard in order to help cope with the storm's onslaught.

On February 7 two children drowned trying to cross the swollen Chapulin River in the central state of Guanajuato, and other child deaths occurred in Angangueo, Zitácuaro, and Ocampo. In total, twenty-eight deaths in the states of Michoacán, Mexico State, and the Distrito Federal (Mexico City) in Mexico were attributed to the storm on February 6 and 7.

On February 7, 10 people were dead across Kandahar Province, according to the Afghan Red Crescent Society (ARCS). Najibullah Barith, ARCS's director in Kandahar complained of the lack of local and national resources.

A series of avalanches caused by a storm in eastern Afghanistan killed 172 people on February 8 and 9.

11 were killed by avalanches in Farah, Bamyan, Ghor, and Daykundi provinces between February 4 and 8, a spokesman of the Afghanistan National Disasters Management Authority said. The Afghan flash floods and avalanches left 20 others dead in the rest of the country on February 8. Shah Wali Kot and Shorandam districts were the worst affected.

A series of avalanches caused by a storm in eastern Afghanistan killed 172 people on February 8 and 9.

The 2010 Salang avalanches consisted of a series of at least 36 avalanches that struck the southern approach to the Salang tunnel north of Kabul, Afghanistan on February 8 and 9 in 2010, burying over two miles of road, killing at least 172 people and trapping over 2,000 of travelers. They were caused by a freak storm in the Hindu Kush mountains located in Afghanistan.

Several heavy avalanches killed 15 and on a highway north of Kabul killed at least 15 and injured 55 on February 8 and 9, according to the Afghan Ministry of Public Health (MoPH). A few other avalanches and landslides also hit other parts of the snow laden Hindu Kush.

60 died and hundred were still missing on February 9 a treacherous mountain pass in Afghanistan series of avalanches smashed into and badly damaged an 2.6 km (1.6 mi) long Soviet-built Salang tunnel after several days of heavy snow in the Hindu Kush. Afghan Interior Minister, Hanif Atmar 24 dead were found and 40 more were feared dead. The defence minister, Abdul Rahim Wardak said 3,000 people had been trapped in vehicles along the mountain pass, that is at an altitude 3,400 metres (11,200 feet), but about 2,500 were rescued later that day. The road passengers got trapped in their vehicles outside of the Salang Tunnel, 9 miles north of Kabul. The International Security Assistance Force (ISAF) sent 2 helicopters to help evacuate people and drop essential supplies, a spokesman for the Afghanistan National Disasters Management Authority (ANDMA) said. Only helicopters and pack horses could get there.

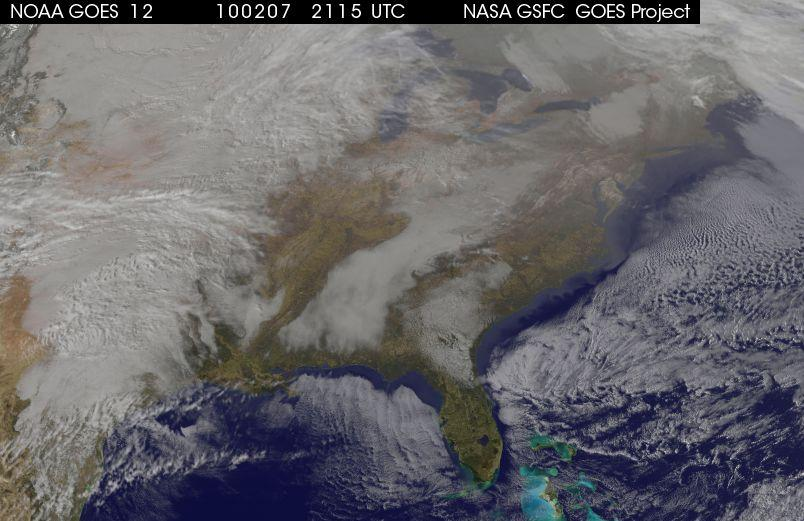
The weather conditions as of February 7, 2010 at 4:00 pm CST

A powerful Alberta clipper from western Canada and moist air from a line of thunderstorms over the mid-western United States merged over the central US on the 7th. In some places this dropped 15 centimetres (6 in) over the Central and Eastern United States, much of it over areas already hit by the previous blizzard. 10–15 inches (25–38 cm) was expected to fall on Washington, D.C., and up to 1–2 feet (0.30–0.61 m) of snow was forecast from New York City northward into New England. Several inches of snow fell in both Washington, D.C., and New York City on the night of February 10 and 11.

On February 8, nearly 45 centimetres (18 in) of snow was recorded at Reagan National Airport, and nearby Dulles International Airport recorded a local record of 80 centimetres (31 in). The storms were dubbed "Snowmageddon", by US president Barack Obama. An area all the way from Pennsylvania to New Jersey, across the BosWash corridor and south down to Virginia, was under at least 60 centimetres (24 in) of snow. Parts of Northern Maryland had 90 centimetres (35 in). The storm killed three people.

Snow began to fall throughout Oxfordshire, North London, and Bavaria on February 8 and 10. Heavy winds and snow flurries also hit parts of Leicestershire, Northamptonshire, in Turkey, and Amur Krai, on February 9. 1 person suffered moderate injuries after slipping on ice in one of the rural northern districts of Amur Krai. On February 10 a deep cyclone formed over the Adriatic Sea bringing heavy snowfall over large parts of Bulgaria, Serbia, Macedonia and lesser parts of Romania. Severe weather warnings were issued in these countries. In Western Bulgaria it snowed non-stop for more than 48 hours, with up to a metre of snow accumulation in Kyustendil.

United States federal government activities were ground to a halt by the, in some places 3 ft deep, snowfall in Washington, D.C., on the 10th. February 11 saw heavy snow east coast USA, but power workers resorted electricity supplies to 100,000 users in Maryland on February 11.

On February 11, at least 10 cm (4 in) of snow fell in some areas, and strong winds caused drifting in places across Kent and East Sussex. Snow also fell in Sheffield, Berkshire, Brighton and the Grampian Mountains. Kent County Council said all primary routes and secondary routes where possible had been gritted on Wednesday afternoon ahead of the snow showers. Chief Inspector Simon Black, of Kent Police, said that all main routes were passable, but some were down to a single snow-free lane and BBC Radio Kent said that drivers should only make essential journeys.

=== February 12–19 ===
Following a storm in the southeast United States on February 12–13, snow was on the ground simultaneously in all 50 U.S. states, an event believed never to have occurred previously. Snow was confirmed in 49 states by February 13, and small patches of remnant snow on the north face of Mauna Kea in Hawai'i were confirmed soon after. The snow on February 12–13 forced the cancellation of Bi-Lo Myrtle Beach Marathon XIII. A record depth of 12.5 inches of snow fell within 24 hours in the Dallas–Fort Worth urban metro on the 13th. The result of the massive snowstorm led school districts being shut down and over 200,000 buildings were left without power, and forced to use fire and candles to light and heat their homes. A 1 ft tall wind-induced wave swept 3 people off of various southern Californian beaches on February 14, slightly injuring one. Light snow fell in both parts of Hampshire and Fife, and heavily in the mountainous regions of Sakhalin Island on the 15th. About 1,800 out of 24,00 flights at Hartsfield Jackson Atlanta Airport were canceled on February 13. Numerous minor car accidents happened all around the Metro Atlanta area.

Moderate amounts of snow fell in Gwent and Northamptonshire on the 16th. Weather forecasters warned of more snow predicted across South East Wales and parts of Central England. Moderate snow fall was reported in both Oxfordshire, Northamptonshire, Leicestershire, the Malvern Hills, Pembrokeshire, Bristol, Aberdeenshire and Greater London on February 17 and 18. The various London Authorities warned of growing travel chaos in London on the 18th.

Over two inches of snow had fallen in part of Gwent, Pembrokeshire and Gloucestershire on the 18th. The roadways in the Gloucestershire town of Dursley had been quickly covered in snow that as a cold weather front moved over the west of the county of Gloucestershire, Chief Inspector Steve Porter, of Gloucestershire Constabulary told motorists to take care and warned that many roads including the B4221 at Gorsley and the A4136 at Longhope had had major accidents. Most of the roads would be closed due to heavy snow for the next few days. Moderate amounts of snow also fell in part of Oxfordshire and Northamptonshire on the 19th.

=== February 20–22 ===
Heavy snowfall occurred in Wales and the Midlands between February 18 and 20. including in the Welsh town of Pant Glas, Gwynedd between the 18th and 20th.

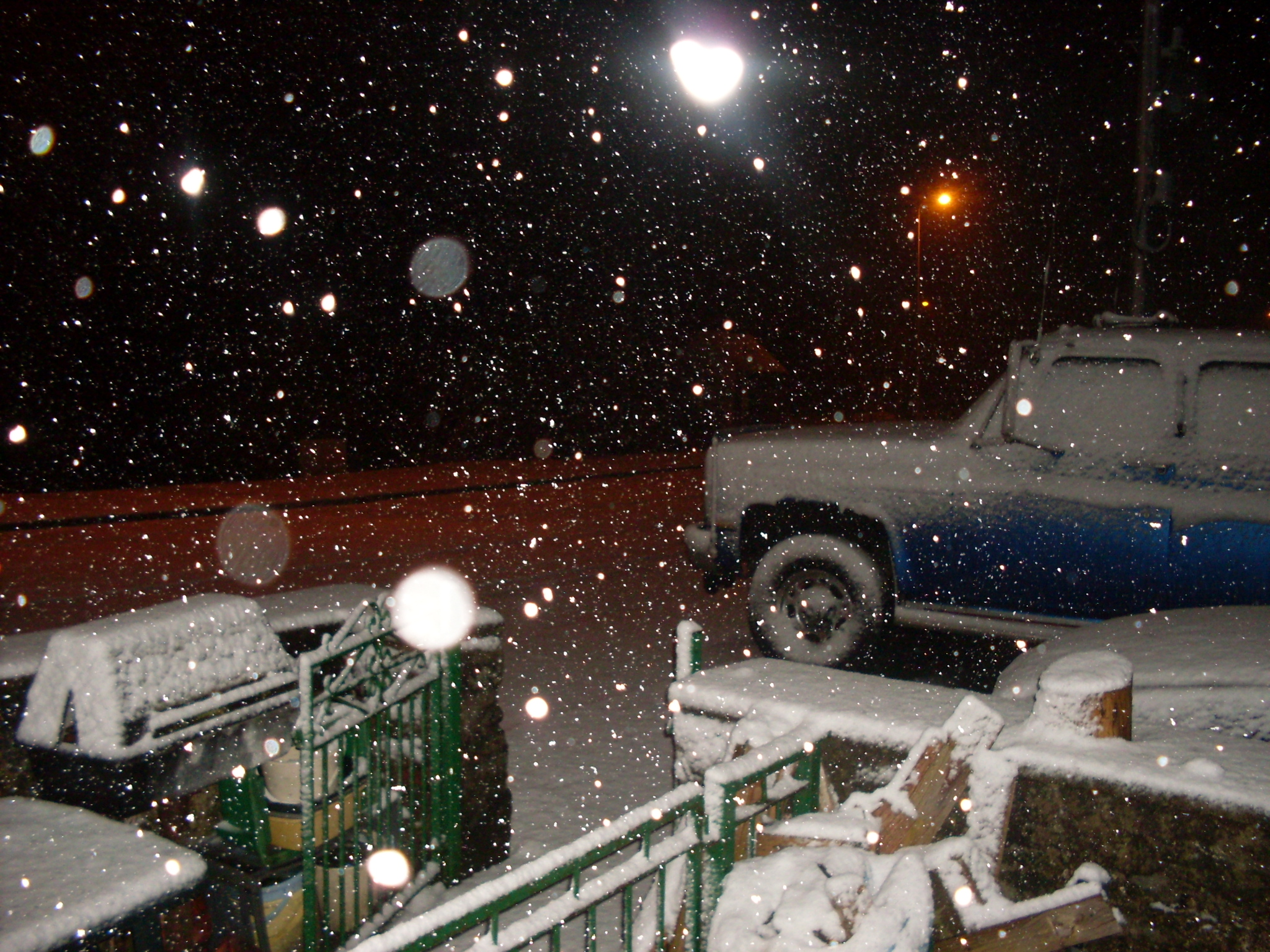
Heavy snowfall during the night in Pant Glas, Gwynedd on the 20th

Heavy snow in Ireland forced the cancellation of the National Hurling League (NHL) hurling match between Kilkenny and Tipperary at Semple Stadium in Thurles on February 20. A horse racing meeting in Naas was abandoned due to heavy snow the following day.

Light snow fell in Oxfordshire overnight on the 20th and 21st, causing minor traffic disruption. Manchester Airport was heavily disrupted late on the 20th, closed at 7.10 am on the 21st, but opened later that morning after much heavy work clearing the snow off of the runways. Flights were still disrupted by midday.

A Eurostar train, with between 700 and 800 passengers on board, broke down in Kent due to the extremely cold weather and heavy snow in the United Kingdom.

Between 6 am and 11 am local time (and UTC), 108 mm (4 1/4 in) of rain was recorded at Funchal weather station and 165 mm (6 1/2 in) of rain at the weather station on Pico do Areeiro. The average rainfall in Funchal for the whole of February was 88.0 mm (3 1/2 in). Damage was confined to the southern half of the island.

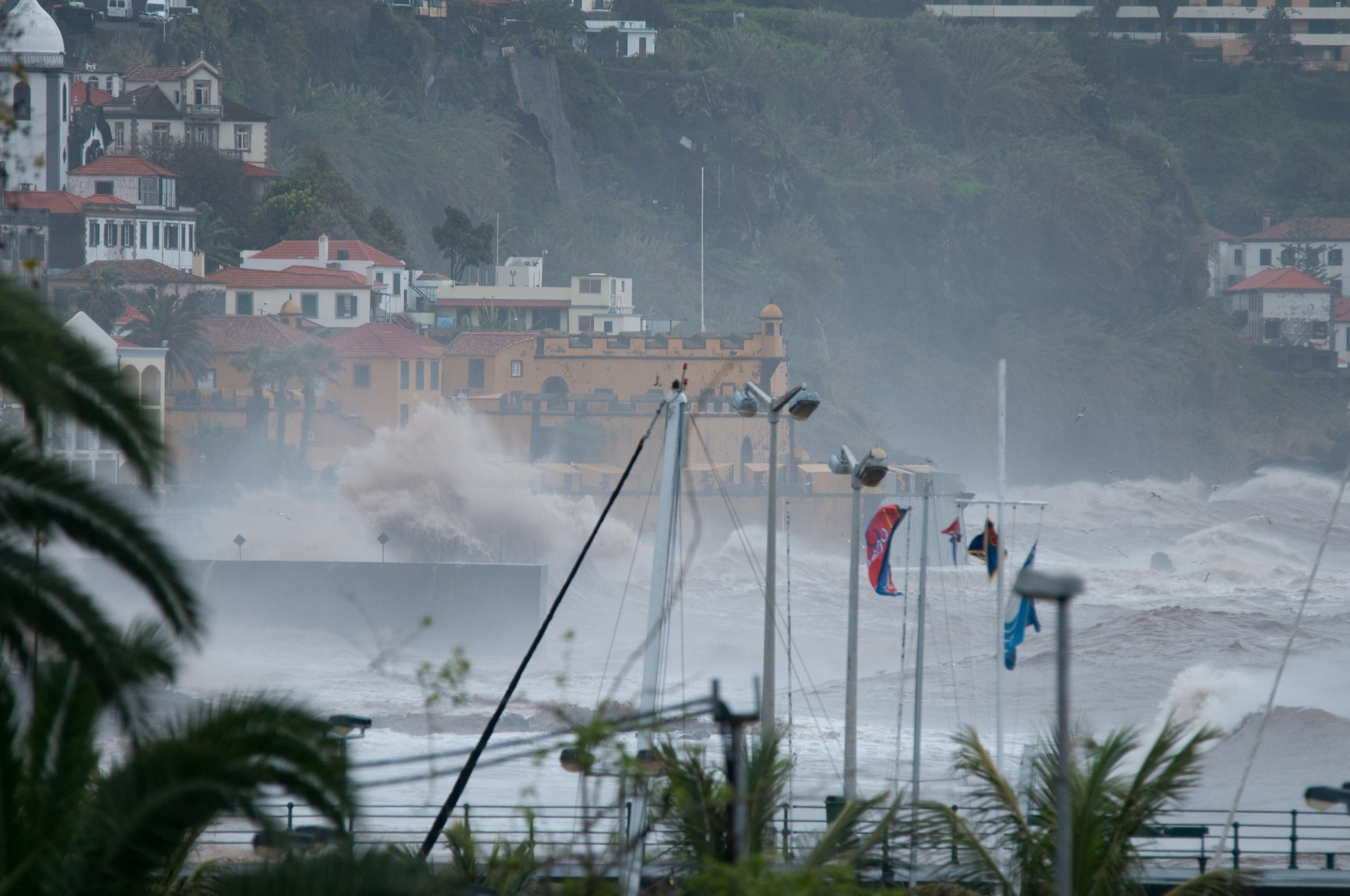
Waves during the Madeira flooding

About 42 people were reported dead and about 68 to 100 injured as rain-induced floods and mudslides hit the Portuguese island of Madeira on the 20th, local authorities said. The floodwaters tore down buildings, overturned cars and knocked down trees. According to Portuguese media, the storms were the deadliest on the east Atlantic island since prior to October 1993, when 8 people died and 19 were injured.

The Portuguese military sent specialist rescue teams to Madeira on the 21st, when it was estimated that least 38 people were known to have died in the most extreme rainstorms in 17 years as tonnes of mud and stones brought down the slopes of the island, flooding the streets of the regional capital, Funchal, and other towns. All utilities were knocked out across large swathes of the island. Ribeira Brava was also badly flooded on the 21st. Portuguese Prime Minister Jose Socrates, who was in Madeira, ordered an immediate rescue and aid mission for the island.

A Portuguese Navy supply ship, with a helicopter, food and medical equipment was sent to the islands that lie about 900 km/560miles from the Portuguese mainland. Officials from the Portuguese Department of Emergencies said that emergency teams, military rescuers, search dogs and firefighters were being sent to the island. Local authorities informed the AFP news agency that 70 people were hospitalized. On February 22, 102 to 120 were confirmed injured and 42 were confirmed dead in Madeira.

=== February 23–28 ===
Heavy snow fell in Oxfordshire, the English Midlands and Merseyside on the 23rd and heavy snow fell in the Scottish Highlands on the 24th.

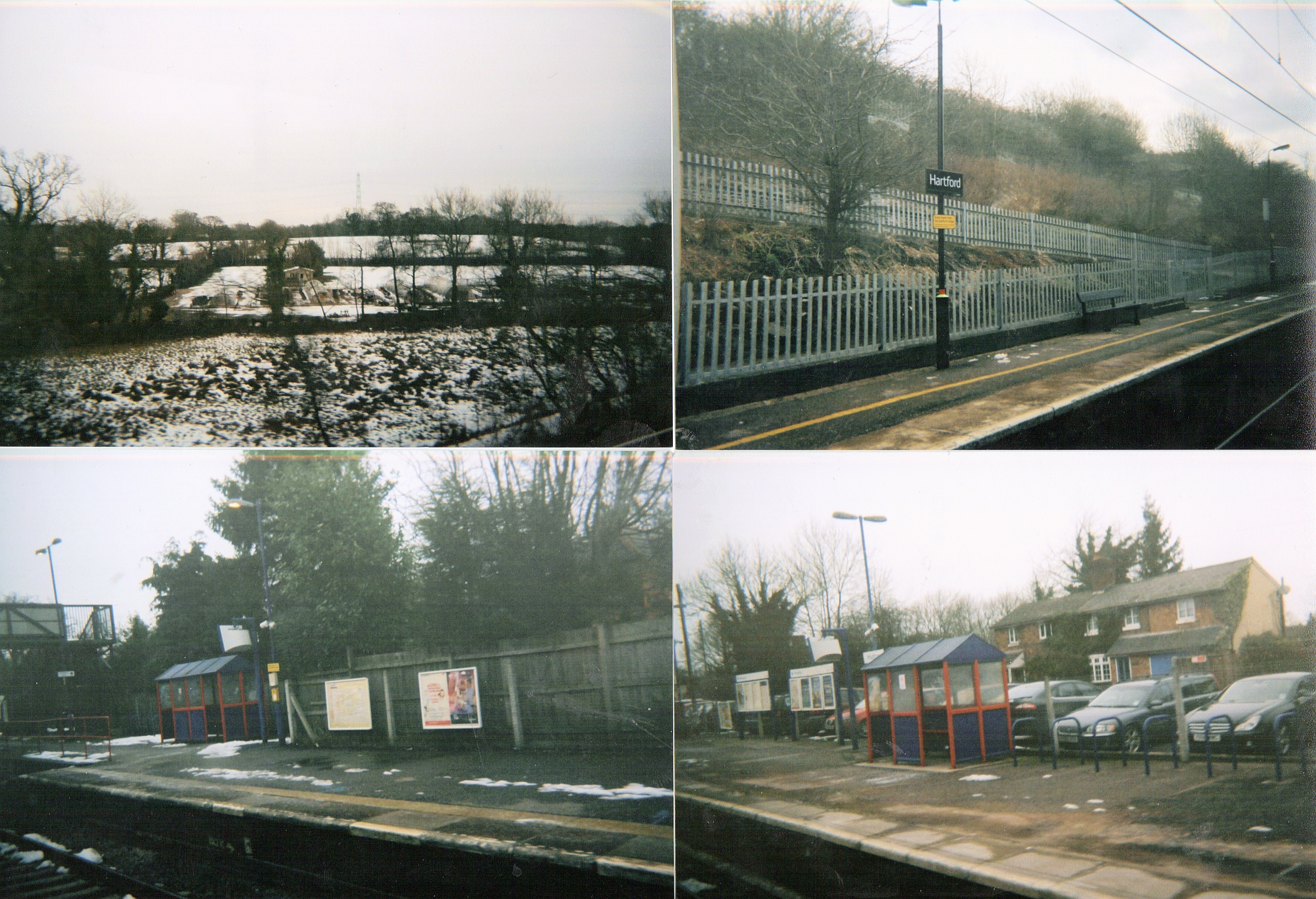
Pictures of snow fall from the last week of February 2010. Top left - A peace of landscapes between Hatton and Lapworh in Warwickshire, top right - Hartford in Cheshire station, bottom left - Hatton station and bottom right - Lapworth station under snow.

On February 24, a meteorological state of emergency was declared in 21 Mongolia's provinces due to the exceptionally cold conditions. It was purported to be the coldest snap for 50 years, and a person had died of hypothermia.

A major winter storm started plowing its way through upstate New York, southern Vermont and Berkshire County, Massachusetts on the 23rd. Colonie, New York saw a total of 17 inches of snow. Hancock, Massachusetts had seen 9.5 inches, with the forecast total at 10–15 inches, and Stamford, Vermont had seen 9 inches.

Salem County, New Jersey was hit by heavy snow fall on the 24th, and 4 to 12 inches of snow were predicted to fall the next day by weather forecasters. Just under 1,000,000 were left without electricity in New England, Pennsylvania and New York.

On February 23, snow fell in Southeast Texas. Snow accumulated in counties north of Houston such as Conroe, Texas, which received 2 inches of snow. Huntsville, Texas had seen about 2 to 3 inches as well as College Station. Only a trace of snowfall fell in Houston, Texas.

A winter storm warning was issued for counties north of Houston, while Houston had a winter weather advisory.

The extreme winter storm spun around the Northeast by the 25th. Oneonta, New York had seen 113 cm (44.5 in) of snow from this storm. New York City had seen 53 cm (20.9 in), and Philadelphia had seen 29 cm (11.5 in) of snow. Washington, D.C., and Baltimore had remained under light rain. Boston saw 11 cm (4.5 in) of rain from this storm, and 23 cm (9.2 in) was reported in Belfast, Maine. Major flooding prevailed along coastal New England. The Shawsheen River at Wilmington, Massachusetts was at 8 feet above its banks, and the Merrimack River at Amesbury, Massachusetts was at 20 feet above banks. On Friday morning and night, most of Massachusetts, New Hampshire and Maine were without power. Sustained winds of up to 65 mph pounded the Cape Ann area of eastern Massachusetts. Wind gusts of up to 95 mph were reported in Gloucester, Massachusetts and Rockport, Massachusetts. Millions of trees were felled in the wind from Providence to Bangor. Boston received 52 mph sustained winds and 74 mph gusts. Between February 25 and 26 flood warnings covered most of Rhode Island, the Pawtuxet River Valley, Boston and Norfolk County in eastern Massachusetts. Orange County, New York saw 2 to 3 feet of snow in Montgomery and Bullville.

Widespread snowfall across Scotland brought extreme disruption. 61 cm of snow was recorded in Aviemore as hundreds of people were stranded in cars in Dunblane. Schools and transport services were disrupted. Two people died in Glencoe in an avalanche. Temperatures reached −19.2 °C in Braemar. Some people in Perthshire were stranded in their cars for 17 hours. 45,000 homes in Scotland were left without power.

On February 26, heavy snow hit New York and more was forecast for the next day.

On February 27, unusually heavy monsoon rains hit Haiti. 11 people died the town in Les Cayes, 3 died in the village of Torbeck, 5 died in the village of Les Cayes's Gelee as rain induced mudslides and flood waters hit them.

In January 2010, heavy rain caused flooding which buried or washed away roads and railways leading to the ancient city of Machu Picchu, trapping over 2,000 tourists in addition to 2,000 locals. Machu Picchu was temporarily closed, but it reopened on February 28, 2010. Peru's rail crew had been hard at work since then, and Machu Picchu reopened to tourists on April 1, 2010.

=== February 28 – March 2 ===
==== Xynthia ====
24-hour animation from 5 pm, February 27

51 were killed, 59 injured and 12 were missing in France, 6 killed in Germany, 3 killed and 2 severely injured in Spain, 1 killed in Portugal, 1 in Belgium, 1 in the Netherlands and 1 in England as heavy rainstorms hit the Bay of Biscay and central France on the 27th. Winds of up to 140 km/h (87 mph) caused chaos as the storm moved from Portugal up through the Bay of Biscay, while a maximum gust of 228 km/h (142 mph) in Spain and 241 km/h (150 mph) in France were recorded. Both Belgium and Denmark were hit by heavy rainstorms overnight as the windstorm moved further northeast. The storm system moved across the Massif Central into the Brittany peninsula, and areas of France bordering Belgium and Germany were on alert for heavy rain and high winds. The French Prime Minister François Fillon said France would formally declare the storm a natural disaster, freeing up funds to help communities rebuild themselves. Rail services were severely affected in northern Spain and a number of trains in western France were delayed because of flooded tracks. British Airways canceled several flights and Air France said 100 of its flights had been canceled from Charles de Gaulle airport in Paris. Wind speeds hit 175 km/h at the top of the Eiffel Tower, French radio reported on the 28th. The French meteorological service said that shortly after 1700 local time (1600 GMT) the storm passed into Germany, Belgium and the Netherlands, and there also were reports of high winds in the Swiss Alps on March 1. Spain's Canary Islands, particularly La Palma, Gran Canaria and Tenerife, were also hit by the storm. The French Departments of Vendée and Charente-Maritime were in ruins and over 1 million homes lost electricity supplies. Television, radio and mobile phone service were also disrupted in some places.

On February 28, the French storms killed 7 people who drowned in various villages in the Vendée region, while 3 seniors and a child were found dead in Charente Maritime near La Rochelle. A man was killed by a falling tree branch in the south-western town of Luchon, where winds reached 90 mph. At least five other people were reported missing and dozens others injured and a kid died in Northern Portugal 5 people were missing and 1 was injured in Aytre. The French Interior Minister Brice Hortefeux declared the storm as a natural catastrophe. The Météo France meteorological service predicted the storm was by then heading towards Denmark.

== March ==
=== March 1–5 ===
It was confirmed on March 1 that 45–52 (reports vary) French people had died, and that the French government had launched an equine in to why the incident had been so disastrously mishandled, especially around La Rochelle and L'Aiguillon-sur-Mer. Nicolas Sarkozy visited the coastal town of Aiguillon-sur-Mer, the hardest hit area of France where a total 25 had died in the storm.

The 2010 Queensland floods saw inundation of the towns of Charleville, Roma, St George and Theodore among others. The floods were caused by rainfall generated by a monsoon trough described by a Bureau of Meteorology forecaster as "almost like a tropical cyclone over land". Over the period March 1–3, rainfall totals of between 100–300 mm (3.9–11.8 in) were observed in the area. This water ran into already saturated rivers and creeks in the area. Losses from cotton crops destroyed at Theodore and the area around St George and Dirranbandi were expected to be significant.

The floods, described by the Queensland Minister for Primary Industries Tim Mulherin as the "worst flood in 120 years", were, however expected to provide a billion dollar boost to the local economy, following the "worst drought since Federation". The floods saw a large increase in the Australian plague locust population, and the Australian Plague Locust Commission was concerned the locusts would head south and destroy what was expected to be a bumper winter grain crop.

The 2010 Uganda landslide occurred in the district of Bududa in eastern Uganda on March 1, 2010. The landslide was triggered by heavy rain between 12 pm and 7 pm that day. At least 100 people were believed to have been killed.

The Ugandan Red Cross stated that rescuers had recovered 50 bodies, whilst a Ugandan government minister put the death toll at over 100. The chairman of the eastern Bududa district suggested that the death toll could be as high as 300. The landslide struck villages on the slopes of Mount Elgon, including Nameti, Kubewo, and Nankobe. Officials and aid workers warned that there may be further landslides, as heavy rain continues to fall in the region.

AirTran Airways canceled several flights out of Atlanta Airport due to bad weather on March 1 and 2.

On March 1, the Environment Agency issued 169 flood warnings in over East Anglia, Yorkshire, Wrexham, Tyne and Wear, Cambridgeshire, Bedfordshire, Oxfordshire, Kent and West Sussex. The Thames Barrier closed twice in less than 24 hours to protect London from a combined high tide and tidal surge in the Thames estuary, where it had been predicted that the water would rise by another 50 cm. Andy Batchelor, Tidal Area Flood Risk Manager, said that the Thames Barrier would close yet again should we need to protect the 1.25 million people living and working in London's floodplain.

On March 2, heavy snowstorms struck the Virginias and parts of Maryland.

The Ewaso Nyiro River in Kenya burst its banks and flooded a safari park's guest house on the 3rd, killing nine people.

On March 4, 20 people died in Afghanistan, when an avalanche struck 2 villages in the Wakhan Mountains.

Several dozen ships, some with nearly one thousand passengers were stranded in rapidly forming sea ice due to cold weather and strong winds in the Gulf of Bothnia, between Sweden and Finland and near the Baltic Sea. Some of the ships were freed by icebreakers on March 5.

On March 5, 20,000 people were left homeless when flood-induced landslides struck Bududa, Uganda.

=== March 6–20 ===
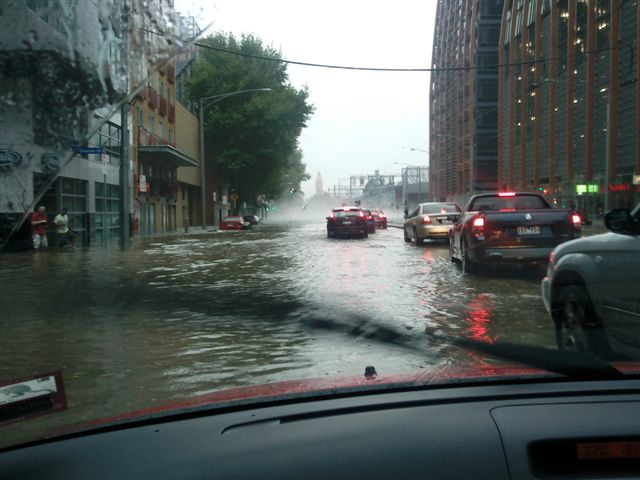
Flash flooding in Flinders Street, Melbourne, March 6, 2010

The 2010 Victorian storms were a series of storms that passed through much of the Australian state of Victoria on March 6 and 7, 2010. One of the most severe storms passed directly over Greater Melbourne, bringing lightning, flash flooding, very large hail and strong winds to the state's capital. It was described as a "mini-cyclone".

On March 8, Catalonia saw its heaviest snowfall in 25 years; up to 50 centimeters fell in Barcelona. Over 200,000 residents of North-Eastern Spain were left without power, and up to 500 passengers were evacuated from a train traveling to Southern France, which also was experiencing blizzard conditions, with many schools closing. Nîmes and Perpignan were the worst-hit.

A state of emergency was declared in Northern Spain, on March 10, due to the unseasonal blizzards. Forty roads in France were closed with snow reportedly 3 ft deep in some areas. Italy also experienced the effects of the Arctic blast; there was traffic chaos in Siena, Assisi and Pisa, with snowstorms stretching as far south as Rome. On Majorca, havoc ensued with 6 major roads closing, due to unseasonal snowfall.

On March 10, transportation and power supplies were disrupted by blizzards around Zagreb, hurricanes around Rijeka and a mixture of both in Dalmatia. Both Istria, the northern Adriatic coast and Lika, had electricity supply problems, according to Croatian Power Company (HEP).

Heavy rain and rapid snow-melt contributed to the failure of the Kyzyl-Agash dam in Kazakhstan on March 11, killing more than 40 people.

On March 12, about 4,000 people were made homeless by floods in the Kazakh towns of Almaty, Kyzyl-Agash, and Zhylbulak. A total of 30 people had been confirmed dead as the flood waters from, the dam that had burst on the 12th reached 2 meters deep on March 13.

The American military officials closed Misawa Air Base on March 10, as a blizzard swept across northern Japan, dumping a record-setting 20 inches of snow on the base by mid-afternoon. A cyclone with snowstorms approached Kamchatka coast from the Sea of Okhotsk on the 13th and moved inland by the 15th, after which the storms died out in Eastern and Central Kamchatka with no casualties. The Ust-Bolsheretsk, Petropavlovsk-Kamchatsky and Yelizovo districts of Kamchatka were badly hit by the high wind and snowfall.

The fourth major winter storm to strike the East coast of the United States caused widespread flooding, severe beach erosion, and tree and structural damage from Virginia to Maine on the 13th. The storm killed at least nine people, and left over 1 million without electricity. After the storm, severe to record flooding occurred at the Pawtuxet River in Rhode Island and along the upper tributaries of the Mississippi River.

On March 16, BBC Weather reported that areas of Portugal and Spain witnessed the highest recorded levels of precipitation since World War II.

Australia faced the worst flooding in 60 years as 134 people in the small rural town of Wanaaring, just south of the Queensland/New South Wales border, remains cut off on the 18th. The Paroo River peaked at 4.8 meters and broke its banks on the 17th.

A major sandstorm hit Kano in northern Nigeria on the morning of March 19. The whole federal state was filled with sandstorms. All flights into and out of the federal state were canceled amid softy fears. Similar events occurred over the border in the drought hit Niger. The Harmattan wind caused others in Mauritania. Rain fall had paradoxically gone down in the African Sahel region as it went up in most other parts of the World.

=== March 21–24 ===
Cyclone Ului made landfall in southeastern Queensland on the 21st, producing heavy rains and flooding.

After nearly a month of flooding, the Croatian Kosinj Valley was the center of about 11 million Kuna (1,514,000 Euros) worth of damage in the region of Lika, Croat officials said on March 22.

Heavy sandstorms hit Beijing between March 20 and 22. On March 23, a major storm sweeps of the lens west of the Bohai Sea and the Yellow Sea, and finally falls on the North Korea and South Korea. The Xinjiang, Shanxi, Shaanxi and Hebei regions were already faceing drought and sandstorms earlier this month.

A major sandstorms hit both Mauritania, Senegal, the Gambia, Guinea Bissau, Guinea and inland Sierra Leone. Another gets southern Algeria, inland Mauritania, Mali and northern Côte d'Ivoire.

A major hail storm hit Perth, Western Australia, more than 158,000 houses were blacked out at the height of the storm and estimates on the insurance damage were over $1 billion.

=== March 28–31 ===
In the UK, a huge snow storm was expected to drive up from the South West with rain turning to snow Midlands northwards. The UK Met Office issued severe weather warnings for the following regions:

Northern Ireland, North West England, Wales, Yorkshire & Humber, West Midlands, S.W. Scotland, Lothian and Borders, East Midlands and North East England. Temperatures were expected to go sub-zero once again. Snow was forecast from Cardiff, Wales northwards. The warnings came a day after top British meteorologists from outside the UK Met Office predicted the UK's hottest summer on record for 2010 on the 28th.

Snow fell in Scotland on March 30, stranding drivers on a motorway leaving them to dig out their cars. The MetOffice released weather alerts for only Scotland and Northern Ireland as the south was not as cold as forecasted. However, heavy snow was falling on higher ground in England and Wales. Temperatures in the South West of the UK fell dramatically around noon on March 30, and snow fell in some areas in South Wales and South West England.

The Met Office updated its warnings on March 30. The following areas of the UK were in severe weather warnings: Wales, Scotland and Northern Ireland. The Met Office also issued extreme weather warnings of Severe blizzards, severe drifting snow and very heavy snowfall in Western Northern Ireland and North East Scotland, where 40–50 cm of snow was forecasted to fall, with drifts over five feet tall. Heavy thunderstorms hit parts of Hampshire, and temperatures began to rise in Southern England and Greater London.

On March 31, 48,000 Northern Irish, 24,000 Scottish and 150 Irish homes were without power as heavy snow fell in Northern Ireland, parts of Staffordshire, and Scotland's Southern Uplands. About 300 people were freed by rescue services when 120 vehicles ventured out during a blizzard in County Londonderry's Glenshane Pass. 17-year-old Natasha Paton, from Cleghorn in southern Lanarkshire died as the coach she was in skidded and crashed in the snow on the A73 road, outside Wiston, also in southern Lanarkshire. The UK Met Office issued severe weather warnings for the next day in the following regions: Northern Ireland, Northern England, Wales and Scotland.

The storm followed the coldest winter in decades to hit the UK, and was the second most severe storm to hit the UK this year. The most severe was the January 6 snowfall in Southern England and South Wales. Despite lower snow depth of 40 cm, the south was less prepared and has a higher population density than Northern Ireland and Scotland, so the storms caused more chaos and damage to the UK economy. First Great Western closed both Islip railway station and Bicester Town railway station for part of the day due to heavy snow fall on exposed stretches of track. Snow also caused travel disruption for buses and cars in South Glamorgan.

Both the Rhone and the Danube begsn to swell at their upper sections due to heavy rain and snow related melt water on the 31st.

== April ==
On March 31, the UK Met Office issued severe weather warnings for April 1 i Northern Ireland, Northern England, Wales and Scotland. Heavy rain fell in Banbury and moderate snow fell in Scotland on the 2nd.

April 1 and 2 had temperatures plummet to minus 50 degrees in Mongolia's Tuul valley. The Mongolian Red Cross reported that about 4,500,000 head of livestock died as a result of the bad weather this year. Tume, who lives in Ulan Bator, said that he had noticed that there were several harsh winters in a row. He blamed climate change, but experts said that overgrazing by cattle had also killed off most of the country's grassland.

The April 2010 Rio de Janeiro floods and mudslides were an extreme weather event that affected the State of Rio de Janeiro in Brazil in the first days of April 2010. At least 212 people died, 161 people were injured (including several rescuers), while at least 15,000 people were made homeless. Meteolagists exspessed concern over the intensity of the storms and their aftermath. The worst part was on the 5th and 6th.

Two buildings suddenly fell into the River Buriganga in Nababerchar city's Kamrangirchar district during a heavy storm on April 17, 2010. Bangladeshi police claimed the foundations were weakened by illegal lifting of sand by local sand traders. Heavy rain also hit the borders of Armenia and Azerbaijan in the evening.

A major snowstorm hit New England after the western side of a low pressure system sank southward from eastern Ontario on April 27, merging with part of a second low. Vermont was hit with the most snow, which totaled as much as 60 cm (2.0 ft). Close to 30,000 customers were left without power.

In late April, snow fell east of the Rocky Mountains in southern Alberta as the cold sector of a storm dumped over 25 cm (9.8 in) of snow in the Calgary area. Highway 2 was closed, ice coated some roads, and another 10 cm (3.9 in) was expected to fall on Friday along with strong winds.

== May ==
=== May 1–7 ===
==== May 1–7: Asia ====
One of the hottest seasons on record was recorded in India through May, prior to the monsoon season. At least 250 people died from the country's heat wave. A major dust storm hit New Delhi, India on May 6, 2010.

==== May 1–7: Europe ====
Heavy rain fell in western Azerbaijan on May 1. By May 2, a rain-induced landslide in Alunitdag village in Dashkasan District (western Azerbaijan) covered the yards of two smallholdings. May 5, further rain and flooding happened in most of the country's east.

Heavy rainfall in parts of Poland raised the prospect of flooding in the town of Slubice.

=== May 10 – July 14 ===
The 2010 South China floods began in early May 2010. 392 people died and a further 232 people were reported missing as of June 30, 2010; this included 57 people in a landslide in Guizhou. 53 of the deaths occurred from the flooding and landslides between May 31 and June 3, and 266 deaths occurred between June 13 and 29. 424 people were killed by the end of June, including 42 from the Guizhou landslide; 118 more were killed and 47 left missing in the start of July, bringing the death toll to 542. More than 72.97 million people in 22 provinces, municipalities and regions, including the southern and central provinces of Zhejiang, Fujian, Jiangxi, Hubei, Hunan, Guangdong, Guangxi, Chongqing Municipality, Sichuan and Guizhou were affected, while at least 4.66 million people were evacuated because of the risk of flooding and landslides in the latter half of June.

=== May 16 – June 1 ===
The 2010 Central European floods were a particularly devastating series of weather events that occurred across several Central European countries during May, June and August 2010. Poland was the worst affected. Austria, the Czech Republic, Germany, Hungary, Slovakia, Serbia and Ukraine were also affected.

Country	Deaths
Poland	25
Austria	3
Serbia	2
Hungary	2
Slovakia	1–3
Czech Republic	1–2
Total	31–34

On May 16, in southern Serbia about 300 people were evacuated due to flooding after heavy rainfall in the country. The flooded area was left with no electricity, telephone lines, or running mains water. Two people drowned in a flooded Pčinja River.

On May 17, one person died in the Hungarian town of Miskolc, while two others died in the Serbian town of Trgovište due to flooding created by heavy rainfall.

=== May 20–26 ===
==== May 20–26: Americas ====
Heavy rain began to fall in Guatemala City on the 24th, causing local rivers to flood. Heavy rain was also reported in parts of Mexico, Honduras, and southwestern Brazil.

As the storm moved inland, torrential rains triggered flash flooding and landslides in parts of Honduras on May 30. At least 45 homes were destroyed and one person was killed in the country. On May 31, the presidents of both El Salvador and Honduras declared a state of emergency for their respective countries. Tropical Storm Agatha had picked up speed and strength over the Central American state of Belize, in the Atlantic basin, on May 31.

==== May 20–26: Asia ====
The 2010 Indian heatwave was a period of extremely hot weather occurring during the summer of 2010 in India and much of South Asia. Said to be the harshest summer since 1800, the heat wave killed hundreds of people due to heat exhaustion and food poisoning.

On May 24, 400 people held a protest in the 1,500-strong village of Altit over the lack of aid provision, following a visit to the settlement by Pakistan's Prime Minister. One protester said he was sheltering in a Gilgit school building and that there were too few doctors in the camp. The only reliable means of transport in the disaster zone was by Army helicopter. About 32 villages in the Hunza–Nagar District were said by the local administration to be flooded. The flooding lake was formed after a 2.5-metre (8.2 ft) deep landslide in January.

The hottest temperature ever recorded in Asia was reached in Mohenjo-daro, Sindh, Pakistan at 53.7 °C (128.7 °F), on May 26, and multiple cities in Pakistan saw temperatures above 43 °C (109 °F). The previous record for Pakistan, and for all of Asia, was reached at 52.7 °C (126.9 °F) in Sindh Province on June 12, 1919. By May 27, after temperatures higher than 45 °C (113 °F) hit areas across the country, at least 18 people died in Pakistan from the heat.

==== May 20–26: Europe ====
Warsaw faced imminent rain-related flooding as the Vistula river burst its banks and inundated many nearby villages on May 20. The Vistula river burst its banks on May 21 and flooded nearby towns. Warsaw was put on flood alert. 23,000 people were displaced in the worst Polish floods in 160 years. EU officials said Poland would receive 100 million euros in aid from the European Union solidarity fund. The Vistula was at a 160-year high and £2,000,000 worth of damage was done in Poland. Austria, Hungary, the Czech Republic, Slovakia and Poland all witnessed heavy rainfall, as rivers began to swell in Slovenia and eastern Germany.

On May 23, the floods hit the city of Wrocław as the Ślęza river broke a dyke and flooded into the Kozanow neighborhood. The Vistula River reached 7.8 metres (26 ft) in height and, like the floods in general, was at a level not seen in 60 years.

On May 24, levees failed or were tactically dynamited, southern Poland was hopelessly flooded, and the River Oder began to flood Germany. $2,500,000,000 worth of damage was done in Poland as the river Vistula flooded along its entire length and Poland's death toll reached 15.

By May 25, another £400,000,000 worth of damage was done and 15 Poles were reported dead. Flooding also affected nearby parts of Germany.

Parts of Lower Austria, the Polish town of Slubice and the German city of Frankfurt an der Order started to be flooded from the rivers Spree and Oder on May 27 due to heavy rain. Heavy rain fell across the English Midlands.

==== May 20–26: Middle East ====
A large dust storm swept across both Libya and Egypt on May 26.

=== May 27–30 ===
On May 30, Guatemalan President Alvaro Colom declared a ‘state of calamity’ as the first tropical storm of the Eastern Pacific hurricane season, Hurricane Agatha flooded about 600 homes and killed 12 people the day after a volcanic eruption. The rain made the volcanic ash set like concrete on and around Guatemala City and the city's main airport. A total of thirteen people had already died in El Salvador the day before. People living in or traveling to flood zones in the capital and five other cities were to relocate to shelters, according to a statement on the civil protection agency's website. The Miami-based National Hurricane Center issued an advisory that the storm had strengthened, with maximum sustained winds of 45 miles per hour (72 km/h) or more predicted during the next 48 hours.

== June ==
=== June 1–6 ===
==== June 1–6: Americas ====
On June 1, the National Hurricane Center stated that the remnants of Tropical Storm Agatha had only a low chance of regeneration in the western Caribbean Sea. By the next day, the thunderstorm activity associated with Agatha in the western Caribbean had dissipated. The storm had severely damaged Guatemala's principal airport with rain induced floods. It also resulted in the death of 1 person in Nicaragua, 152 people killed and 100 left missing in Guatemala (due to landslides), 13 deaths in El Salvador and 16 fatalities in Honduras. On June 6, the remnants of Agatha dissipated completely, after hitting Honduras.

==== June 1–6: Asia ====
25 died between June 2 and 4 in a heavy rainstorm in Pakistan's Punjab Province and a blizzard hit the Pakistani-held parts of Jammu and Kashmir.

==== June 1–6: Europe ====
On June 2, police in the Czech Republic warned of vehicles’ aquaplaning after a man died in a flooded street due to it. In Slovakia, a 38-year-old man died searching for another man who had fallen into a swollen river. 2,000 people were evacuated in the northern Hungarian town of Paszto. Major flood alerts hit Serbia and Bosnia as their rivers swelled with floodwater. Government officials in Serbia said the situation was "critical". A Croatian drowned in a flooding Istrian river. A total of 250 liters per square meter (6.1 U.S. gal/sq ft) of rain fell in Zupanja, Croatia, on June 3. The Croatian government sent 5,000 1.5-liter (1.6 U.S. qt) bottles to the Zupanja region, and the Croatian Red Cross launched an emergency appeal. Meanwhile, there was more rain in Croatia and Slovenia. On June 2, several heavy thunderstorms also hit the high Swiss Alps, accompanied by heavy snow in some places.

The Hungarian flood level was critical on June 5.

==== June 1–6: Middle East ====
The 93 mph (150 km/h) Cyclone Phet hit Oman's Masirah Island after 1,000 Omanis and 50,000 Pakistanis were evacuated on June 4. (Phet (Thai: เพชร) is a Thai word meaning diamond.) Cyclone Phet made landfall at Thatta about 50 kilometres (31 mi) south from Karachi, Pakistan on June 6, 2010, at about 4:30 pm GMT.

==== June 1–6: Oceania ====
A waterspout unexpectedly moved onshore as a tornado at Lennox Head, New South Wales, Australia on June 3. 40–100 houses were damaged, and several people were injured by the tornado.

=== June 6–8 ===
June 6 saw heavy rain hit the sun-scorched UK and Ireland. Heathrow Airport had June 6's hottest spot at 28 °C (82 °F).

On June 7, 150 Polish schools were closed, flood hit Slovakia received 25,000,000 Euros ($30,000,000) in EU aid, and river levels in Budapest reached 8.2 metres (27 ft). The death toll included 1 Hungarian, 3 Slovaks, and 25 Poles.

The Polish towns of Wilkow and Winiary flooded. The river level in Warsaw reached 7.80 metres (25.6 ft) and a local dam collapsed, flooding part of the city on June 8. The Polish city of Sandomierz was cut off by flooding.

On June 8, a flood alert was issued in Belgrade as the river Danube was rising by 1 centimetre (0.39 in) per hour in the city.

On June 8, heavy thunderstorms hit the British Isles, ending the 6-day-long heat wave.

=== June 13–17 ===
==== June 13–17: Asia ====
About 42 people were killed by heavy monsoon-related landslides, winds and flash floods in the south of Bangladesh on June 15. Some flooding was also reported in India's Tamil Nadu and West Bengal provinces.

==== June 13–17: Europe ====
Over June 15 and 16 about 40 cm (16 in) of rain fell in the French Côte d'Azur region. At least 1,000 people were evacuated and spent the night in empty schools or other temporary shelters, and some 175,000 houses were estimated to have been left without power as rescue teams moved 436 prisoners from a flooded jail in Draguignan. The rain was worst in Roquebrune-sur-Argens and Frejus; it continued into June 17. Both rail and air travel in the region were interrupted, with 300 or so passengers who were traveling on a high-speed train between Nice and Lille trapped by floodwater spilling over the tracks near Nice. The railway line between Toulon and Frejus was closed until the morning of June 17, due to water-induced subsidence of the track and debris on the line. Fallen trees and landslides also blocked many roads for the next 24 hours. Meteorologists said it was the worst such event in the region since 1827. The ultimate death toll was 22.

=== June 21–30 ===
==== June 21–30: Americas ====
On June 21, the Salvadoran Red Cross Society said the El Salvador flood emergency appeal funds were nearly exhausted.

The price of oil rose to $77 per barrel on June 24 as a cyclone began to form in the south-western Caribbean.

On June 25, the Category 3 strength Hurricane Darby hit Mexico's Pacific coast (passing 245 miles (395 km) south-west of Acapulco) with hurricane-force winds reaching up to 22 miles (35 km) from the eye.

On June 30, Hurricane Alex hit north-eastern Mexico. An area 35–40 miles (56–64 km) north of the town of La Pesca was hit by winds up to 105 mph (169 km/h) as the storm moved northward.

==== June 21–30: Asia ====
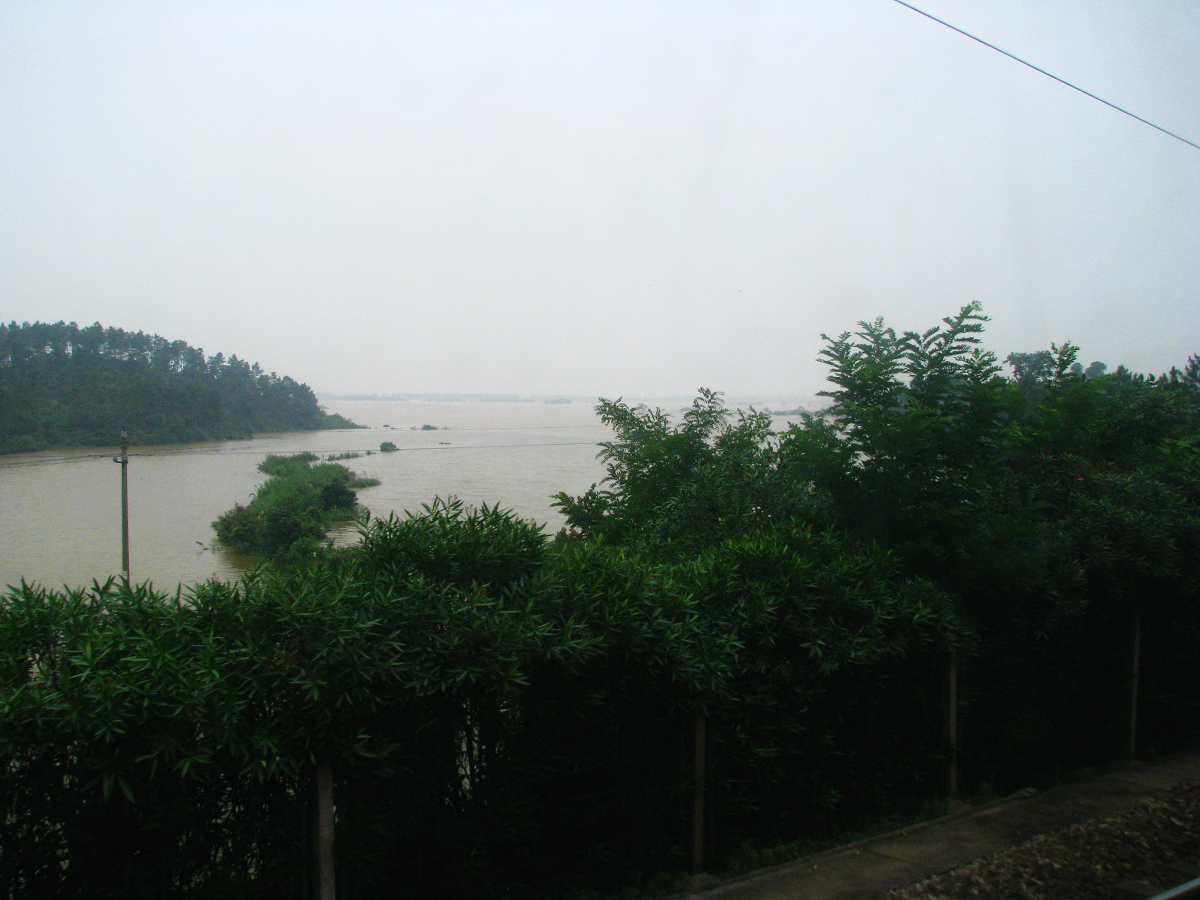
Flooding along the Gan River in Zhangshu, Jiangxi on June 21

The rain-swollen Gan River burst its banks and flooded Zhangshu, Jiangxi, China on June 21.

June 27 to 29 saw the heaviest rainfall for 300 years in the Luolou township of the Chinese Guangxi Zhuang Autonomous Region. 6,673 people were affected; the town was cut off, schools were closed, and people traveled by boat.

On July 30, Malteser International, the relief service of the Order of Malta, gave disaster relief to about 10,000 in the flood-ravaged Swat District of Pakistan. The Khyber Pakhtunkhwa saw at least 400,000 people affected by the floods, which were the most severe ones since 1929. The abnormally heavy rain killed 300 Pakistanis and a cholera epidemic was expected in its wake.

==== June 21–30: Europe ====
Heavy rainfall happened in central and north-eastern Romania between June 22 and 29.

1,870 people were evacuated from villages in Suceava county, as the river Siret threatened to overflow on the afternoon of June 28. Some 1,100 sheep were moved to higher ground in the mostly rural region. Refugees were taken by local monasteries, schools, cultural centers, and relatives. Gheorghe Flutur, president of Suceava county, said his region was one of the worst hit in the country. Later that day, the Siret threatened to break through the dikes protecting the town of Șendreni, as locals and emergency services reinforced the dikes with sandbags by the truck-full to prevent the river from breaking out and flooding the town.

The north-eastern town of Dorohoi witnessed six deaths on June 29 as floods rose to just over 1 meter (3.3 ft) in some places. Several roads into Dorohoi remained either washed away or under water. Ten people were killed by the floods in total. The railway line to Ukraine, electricity pylons, bridges, and roads were damaged across northern and eastern Romania.

The Romanian counties of Alba, Arad, Bacău, Botoșani, Brașov, Cluj, Hunedoara, Iași, Mehedinți, Neamț, Olt, Prahova, Sălaj, Sibiu, Suceava, Timiș, Tulcea, Vâlcea, and Vrancea were flooded in late June. Botoșani, Suceava, and Tulcea counties took the brunt of the damage. Also affected was Chernivtsi province in the neighboring Ukraine.

On June 29 and 30, Romanian Prime Minister Emil Boc toured the devastated regions in the north-east of the country. Romanian Interior Minister Vasile Blaga told parliament that the losses were equivalent to 0.6% of GDP. The agriculture ministry estimated that, of 2,000,000 hectares (7,700 sq mi; 20,000 km^{2}) of arable land, 12,000 hectares (46 sq mi; 120 km^{2}) were damaged. Moldova and Ukraine had yet to assess the crisis in their flooded regions. Russia gave 70 tonnes (77 short tons; 69 long tons) of humanitarian aid to Ukraine.

On July 9, the European Union's Humanitarian Aid and Civil Protection representative, Kristalina Georgieva, let Belgium send aid to Romania. The fortnight-long floods in Rumania killed 23–24 people, injured 43, made 7,000–18,000 homeless, and caused 60,000,000 Euros (US$76,000,000) of damage. One Ukrainian was killed by the floods in Ukraine's Chernivtsi region.

== July ==
=== July 2–9 ===
==== July 2–9: Americas ====
On July 2, 2010, Hurricane Alex made landfall in Monterrey, Mexico, causing flooding in most of northern Mexico and killing 2 people.

==== July 2–9: Asia ====
Unusually heavy rain hit Phnom Penh, causing transport chaos. The chief of Phnom Penh Municipality's sewage system department said that several hours of rain had overwhelmed the city's drains and flooded most streets. 30–60 centimetres (12–24 in) of rain fell on June 2.

On July 7, 2010, five people died and eight were missing after torrential rains caused flash floods in Huangyuan County, in China's Qinghai Province. The rain hit six towns at about 10 pm and lasted for about 40 minutes that night. It triggered floods that cut transport links, phone, power, and water supplies. Over 80 homes collapsed and 770 were flooded. Disaster relief operations were under way during the heavy flooding, but the county government was still assessing the full losses and financial implications of the heat wave and flash flood.

July 8 saw the highest temperature across the People's Republic of China so far in the summer of 2010, along with heavy rainstorms. Local authorities and the National Meteorological Center also issued an orange flood alert in central and southwest China; the worst floods for 40 years hit these regions.

Heavy rains hit the Hubei and Anhui provinces on July 8, and caused a 3.3-foot (1 m) deep flood which killed 1 person and made 500,000 homeless. On July 9 over 27,370 hectares (105.7 sq mi; 273.7 km^{2}) of farmland were flooded, 242 houses collapsed, and at least 10,157 residents were evacuated in Hubei province according to the Civil Affairs Bureau. Anhui saw 10-year flood and 50-year temperature records, the latter increasing both air-conditioner sales and electricity consumption in Beijing and nearby cities. Both the Golmud River and the Wenquan reservoir overflowed.

July 8 saw the Indian states of Haryana, Punjab, and Himachal Pradesh flooded and arterial highways connecting Delhi to northern towns cut or directly threatened with flooding. Delhi-Manali National Highway 21 remained closed for a second day after water from the rain swollen Beas river flooded in several places near Aut.

A 49-metre (160 ft) breach opened up in the rain-swollen Sutlej Yamuna link canal and two army columns were deployed for rescue and evacuation missions in the disaster zone. The overflowing Ghaggar-Hakra River also flooded Punjab's Patiala district, killing three people.

==== July 2–9: Europe ====
As the floods eased in Central Europe and the Balkans, except for in Romania, temperatures began to climb across Western Europe and the UK between June 30 and July 2.

On July 2 Brussels saw its hottest day since 1976. France, Germany, and the Spanish resort Benidorm had record temperatures as part of Europe's July heat wave. Several heavy thunderstorms hit the low Swiss Alps, accompanied by heavy sleet in some places.

On July 3 a heat wave hit parts of Ryazan province and the cities of Bucharest and Budapest, killing a Romanian man with heatstroke. Heavy thunderstorms hit the high Swiss Alps, accompanied by heavy snow in some locations.

=== July 10–14 ===
==== July 10–14: Asia ====
On July 11, heavy floods hit Haryana in India and damaged the archaeological site of Jognakhera, where ancient copper smelting had been found dating back almost 5,000 years. The Indus valley civilization site was hit by almost 3.0 metres (10 ft) of water as the Sutlej Yamuna Link Canal overflowed.

==== July 10–14: Europe ====
A thunderstorm with heavy rain hit Zürich and the Swiss-French border on July 10. The storm also threatened to close the Avoriaz stage of the Tour de France cycle race.

On July 11, temperatures skyrocketed in Vienna, Berlin, Munich, Amsterdam, Madrid, Lisbon, Zürich, and Bucharest. More heavy thunderstorms hit the high Swiss Alps, accompanied by heavy snow in some places.

On July 12, France and Belgium also saw record temperatures.

Alpine and North Sea thunderstorms swept across south-east and north-west Germany respectively. Heavy rain fall was also reported in parts of the Netherlands, Ireland, Normandy and the English Midlands on July 13.

Thunderstorms hit the English Midlands, Oxfordshire, Ireland, and Northern Ireland. The heatwave ended in the British Isles and north-west Europe.

Heavy storms also hit Warsaw, Vienna and Kyiv between July 14 and 16.

==== July 10–14: Middle East ====
Heavy rain and thunderstorms hit the town of Samail in Oman's northern coastal mountain range on July 14. On that day, heavy rain also fell in most of Iran's East Azerbaijan and West Azerbaijan provinces.

=== July 15–22 ===
==== July 15–22: Americas ====
The 2010 Milwaukee flood was a series of two disasters in the Milwaukee, Wisconsin area of the United States; they happened from July 15 to 23, 2010.

Iowa, Wisconsin, Minnesota, Texas, Kansas and Nebraska had heavy thunderstorms with a bad tornado in Northfield, Minnesota on July 16. Later in the day all of Manitoba, Nebraska, Kansas, Missouri, Tennessee, Mississippi, Wisconsin, and Minnesota had heavy storms. The heat wave was at last dead and blown away by the storms.

Flash flooding in Arizona swept a 12-year-old girl to her death on July 20, 2010.

==== July 15–22: Europe ====
The 2010 Var floods were the result of heavy rainfall in southern France that caused severe floods in the Var department in the evening of July 15, 2010. As well as generalized flooding, there were also flash floods. Meteorologists said the floods were the worst in the region since 1827, with more than 16 in (400 mm) of rain falling in less than 24 hours. At least 25 people were killed, and 14 people were missing.

Trees and chimney pots fell as 84 mph (135 km/h) winds hit parts of Wales and the Bristol Channel area, between July 15 and 16. The winds hit Cardiff, Porthmadog, Pontcanna Fields near Cardiff, coastal Pembrokeshire, southern Monmouthshire, Cheltenham, Gloucester, Aberystwyth, Portmeirion, and Prenteg as heavy gales passed over South Wales and the Bristol Channel.

==== July 15–22: Asia ====
On July 15, the regional representative of the American Red Cross praised the Chinese people, the Chinese Red Cross, and China's Ministry of Civil Affairs for their efforts in fighting the flood. The People's Liberation Army (PLA) was praised for sending contingents of soldiers across the country to any location where a disaster had struck.

Both the Xinjiang region in the northwest and Yunnan province in the south were affected by flooding. In all, flood waters inundated parts of at least 24 of China's 34 provinces and regions on July 20. By July 20, the Yangtze River at the Three Gorges Dam experienced its highest river discharge in 130 years, and the highest since the dam was built. The dam's walls released 40,000 cubic metres (11,000,000 US gal; 40,000,000 L) of water, while 30,000 cubic metres (7,900,000 US gal; 30,000,000 L) per second of the river flow was held back in behind the dam, after water levels in the Reservoir had risen 4 metres (13 ft) overnight. The reservoir's water levels peaked at 158.86 metres (521.2 ft) on the morning of July 23; the alarm level for the reservoir was 145 metres (476 ft). All ferry service in the reservoir was halted when the total flow rate exceeded 45,000 cubic metres (12,000,000 US gal; 45,000,000 L) per second, although the crest of the flooding passed the dam by July 24. A second peak in the river arrived at the dam on July 28, when the peak flow from the dam was a record 56,000 cubic metres (15,000,000 US gal; 56,000,000 L) per second.

It was officially revealed on July 21 that more than 701 people were dead, and that 347 were missing due to the severe flooding in China so far; the floods caused the highest death toll since 1998, which saw the highest water levels in 50 years. The floods affected 100 rivers, 117 million people in 27 provinces, and seven cities. 9,000,000 hectares (35,000 sq mi; 90,000 km^{2}) of farmland and 645,000 houses were destroyed, and 8,000,000 people were evacuated (about the population of New Jersey).

The overall damage totaled 142,200,000,000 Yuan or £13,700,000,000. The Three Gorges Dam project prevented floods like those in 1998, which killed several thousands. The shipping channels in the Three Gorges Dam were closed, but the dam wall was still holding for the time being.

=== July 25–31 ===
About 70 people were killed and 100,000 left homeless between July 19 and 25 in flash floods in Pakistan's south-western Baluchistan province.

Due to the bad weather, an Airblue passenger jet crashed into the Margalla Hills outside Islamabad killing all 152 passengers on July 28.

The Pakistan Meteorological Department said that over 200 millimetres (7.9 in) of rain fell over a 24-hour period over a number of places in Khyber Pakhtunkhwa and Punjab. A record breaking 274 millimetres (10.8 in) rain fell in Peshawar over one 24-hour period; the previous record was 187 millimetres (7.4 in) of rain in 24 hours, recorded in April 2009. Many areas of Khyber Pakhtunkhwa saw more than 200 millimetres (7.9 in) of rain over July 28 and 29, breaking a 35-year-old record. Heavy rainfall was reported all over the Hindu Kush mountains. 80 died in Khyber Pakhtunkhwa province, mostly in the Swat Valley.

An unnamed river flooded the town of Behrain, destroyed a hotel, and caused heavy damage.

A recently built part of a dam in the Charsadda District collapsed; the ensuing wave killed two people and destroyed all the local farms.

On July 31, the information minister of Pakistan's northwestern Khyber-Pakhtoonkhwa province, Mian Iftikhar Hussain, said the latest deaths were in this region. Eight hundred died and thousands had diarrhea, fever and other waterbourne illnesses. About 45 bridges were destroyed in the worst floods since 1928; this severely hampered rescuers, who lacked helicopters.

On July 31, Peshawar in Pakistan was cut off and Pakistani-held parts of Kashmir were also flooded, while the abnormally strong monsoon killed 65 people in mountainous areas across the border in Afghanistan. The EU pledged to give €30,000,000 to Pakistan in aid supplies. 1600 were confirmed dead in Pakistan by the end of August and 60 were dead in Afghanistan by July 31. All 300,000 people in Peshwar were cut off by the flood waters, but helicopters were still able to land there, according to a Khyber-Pakhtoonkhwa provincial official (Mian Iftikhar Hussain). It remained so on August 1, 2010.

== August ==
=== August 1–2 ===
==== August 1–2: Asia ====
On August 1 floods occurred in south-east Afghanistan and continued in the Indus Valley. 1,100–1,400 Pakistani people had been killed and 27,000–30,000 were trapped on high ground, clinging to rooftops and trees. India also suffered substantial dislocations of its road network as rescue workers used boats and helicopters in both nations. There were 900 cases of water-carried illness in Pakistan; the town of Nowshera was flooded.

The rain continued to fall on parts of Pakistan, Afghanistan, and Iranian Baluchistan, and snow blanketed the Pamir Mountains and Ladakh on August 2. About 2,500,000 Pakistanis were now homeless according to the International Red Cross and Mian Iftikhar Hussain said there might be a cholera epidemic in his Khyber Pakhtunkhwa province.

==== August 1–2: Europe ====
Some 4,000 soldiers were called in to help fight both the 6 rumored and several known fires in the Moscow Oblast. Over 5,000 people were evacuated from their homes and Vladimir Putin organized an emergency meeting for August 2 with the governors of the various regions in the Central and Southern Federal Districts devastated by the fires. The grain harvest in the disaster zone was destroyed.

=== August 6–11 ===
On August 7 in China, 700 people were killed and more than 1,000 people were missing and presumed dead as landslides demolished hundreds of buildings in the remote Zhouqu County of Gansu province after several days of heavy rain. The major landslides were triggered by torrential rains and covered an area of 5 kilometres (3.1 mi) by 500 metres (1,600 ft). 45,000 people in Zhouqu county were evacuated as 7,000 soldiers, fire-fighters and medical staff were deployed to tackle the disaster. The rains were the worst floods for a decade, killing over 2,100 people and displacing millions more. The rain stopped on August 10 as the army and firefighters continued to look for survivors.

August 10 saw China's state-run Xinhua news agency report that the authorities sent nearly 3,000 soldiers and about 100 medical experts to help in search and rescue effort in the Gannan and Tibetan Autonomous Prefectures in Gansu province after record floods hit the province. Reports said Zhouqu county had at least 337 dead as rescuers searched for up to 1,148 others who were still missing. Landslides up to five stories deep buried three villages, destroyed roads and bridges, disrupted mobile telecommunications equipment, and cut phone lines, water, and electricity supplies in parts of the region.

The Chinese government sent experts by helicopter to survey the flooding in devastated villages, and examine how to blast open the remaining flood-induced blockages at the end of the valley, according to Chinese state television. In total, about 875,000 homes were destroyed, 9,610,000 million people were evacuated, 22,000,000 acres (89,000 km^{2}; 34,000 sq mi) of crops were destroyed, and tens of billions of dollars in damage were caused by the floods in 28 provinces and regions.

The storms in north-east Jilin province also killed several people and left more than 100 people missing; heavy snowfall was reported in the Himalayas.

August 8 had heavy rainfalls in southwest Kosovo.

=== August 13–29 ===
==== August 13–29: Africa ====
On August 20 the worst floods for 80 years hit Africa's Sahara Desert region. The UN warned that Niger, Chad, Burkina Faso, Cameroon and northern Nigeria were also in the grip of the worst regional food crisis since 2006. In the Sudanian Savanna city of Kano, Nigeria, over 2,000 families were displaced by floods, and in the nearby Jigawa region, an entire village was evacuated due to heavy flooding. A Mauritanian child was swept away in a flood that damaged bridges and many homes in the mountain town of Aioun. Heavy flooding happened around parts of Lake Chad.

==== August 13–29: Europe ====
After weeks without rain, heavy downpours soaked Moscow and nearby areas, bringing further relief for the extended heat wave. However, in Sarov (about 480 kilometres (300 mi) east of Moscow) a new fire started near the country's top nuclear research center. Earlier in August, radioactive and explosive materials were moved out of the facility due to the threat of forest fires; however, they were later returned when the threat lessened. Over 3,400 fire-fighters battled the forest blaze, assisted by a special fire-fighting train. The front end of the forest peat fire-fighting came near the town of Roshal (in the Shatursky district) at one point on August 13.

Heavy rain and thunder storms hit the British Isles between August 13 and 22, leading to heavy flooding in parts of Sussex, Oxfordshire and Buckinghamshire. The low cloud and rain led to the closure of the Bournemouth Air Festival on August 21 and 22. The morning of August 23 saw heavy storms hit Pembrokeshire, the English Midlands and Argyll. Some flooding was reported in Oxfordshire and Pembrokeshire. As the day went on the storms lined up on the east coast between The Wash and Aberdeen, with isolated storms in south-west Gloucestershire, Oxfordshire, south Cambridgeshire, south-west Yorkshire, Leicestershire, and Moray.

== September ==
=== September 1–7 ===
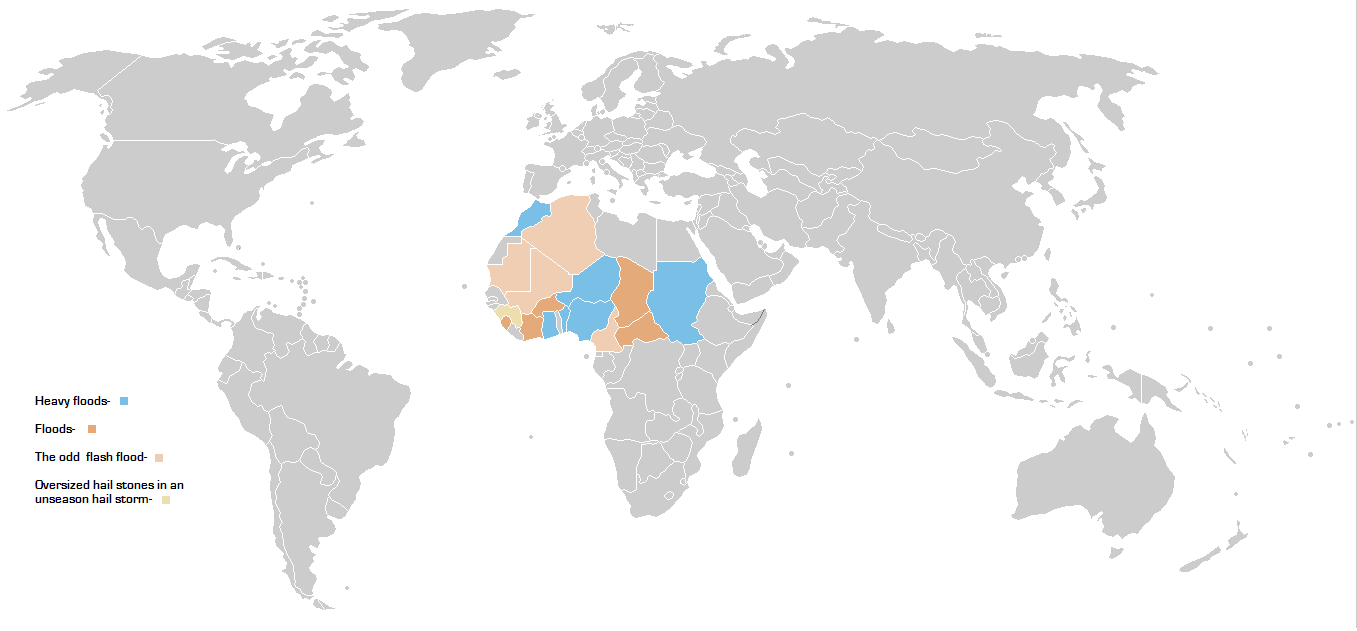
This map shows the nations hit by the 2010 West African floods; the worst hit are colored blue.

==== September 1–7: Africa ====
On September 1, floods hit the Niger River. Flooded ruins were all that was left of three districts of the West African country's capital Niamey (Zarmagandaye, Lamorde and Karadje) It was the worst flooding by the Niger recorded since 1929.

==== September 1–7: Americas ====
September 4 saw a landslide hitting a bus and killing 12 people, as record amounts of rain fell in parts of Guatemala and south-eastern Mexico. Thousands were evacuated from the Mexican Gulf coastline by the state of Tabasco, as the flooding continued to grow.

September 5 saw up to 100 people trapped in a bus by a landslide as torrential rains continued to swamp parts of Guatemala. Most were rescued, but 18 people were killed in the incident.

On September 6, the region's first major tropical storm of the year killed at least 145 people in Guatemala, with at least 53 missing and thousands homeless as emergency crews struggled to reach isolated communities. Tropical Storm Agatha washed away hundreds of roads and collapsed many bridges in the country. The Chimaltenango department's governor, Erick de Leon, said that the landslides buried dozens of small rural Amerindian communities and killed at least 60 around the local village of Santa Apolonia alone. Local volunteers worked desperately to recover the bodies of two brothers, aged four and eight, who were buried by a landslide in the village of Parajbei.

September 6 also saw an overnight landslide (caused by a flood) burying around 100 people who were trying to rescue victims of the previous bus trapped by a landslide along the Inter-American Highway in the Guatemalan Highlands. 23 people were killed in the incident near the town of Santa Maria Ixtaguacan, and 12 had died in the original landslide. The floods were estimated by the government to have killed 45 people on the highway so far, with 38 dying over the last two days of heavy rain and landslides. President Alvaro Colom declared a nationwide state of emergency and urged that citizens to stay off the nation's highways due to the likelihood of more landslides. The week-long heavy rain and floods affected some 40,000 people in the country and caused $350–500 million in damage. He also warned that 24,000 more people were at risk and the government was running out of funds.

Thousands more fled their homes in Honduras after mudslides and landslips killed 15 on September 6. State officials warned people to stay away from any swollen waterways as the rain-swollen reservoirs behind two dams near the capital of Tegucigalpa overflowed the dam walls' ramparts and spilled into a nearby river.

Meanwhile, a weather forecast of more rain was issued across Central America; it prompted officials in Mexico to take precautions against rain induced landslides. Heavy flooding made thousands homeless in the southern Mexican states of Veracruz, Tabasco, Chiapas and Oaxaca. Mexico's national power company opened floodgates on some hydroelectric dams in the region, worsening the flooding in some low-lying areas but causing no deaths and avoiding a catastrophic dam burst situation.

==== September 1–7: Asia ====
The Pakistan government said on September 2 that 1,500 had died across Pakistan so far. Basera (near Muzaffargarh in Punjab province), Jatti (near Thatta in Sindh province, Pakistan), and Larkana (in Sindh province) were still in chaos and choked with refugees on September 2. On September 5 floods hit the squalid refugee camps in Azakhel, miles from Peshawar, Pakistan.

On September 4 storms swept into the prefecture-level city of Luoyang in China's Henan province at 7 am. A total of 15 villages were hit by gales, hail, flood and heavy rain. Several small boats were sunk. One person was reported dead, and electricity poles and telecommunication links were cut down in some villages as well as three bridges destroyed, farm crops destroyed, and several roads blocked, causing about 900,000,000 Yuan or $132,000,000 in material losses.

==== September 1–7: Europe ====
A second day of heavy rain hit the UK on September 6. August 2010 was the coolest since 1993, with the average maximum temperatures 1 °C (34 °F) below normal. The rainfall was much above average in both south-east England and Wales, and the third-wettest August on record had happened in East Anglia; over twice the average August rainfall occurred in 2010.

==== September 1–7: Oceania ====
The 2010 Victorian floods were a widespread series of flood events across the Australian state of Victoria from September 2 to 7. Heavy rainstorms hit New Zealand's South Island on September 2; the same rain system then hit Victoria in Australia. Flooding followed heavy rain across south-eastern Australia and caused the inundation of about 250 homes, hundreds of evacuations, and millions of dollars of damage. Weather warnings were initially issued for Victoria on Thursday, September 2 and rain began to fall on that Friday, continuing through the weekend to Tuesday, September 7. Heavy rain fell in most regions of the state, particularly higher altitudes in the state's west and north-east, flooding the upper reaches of many of Victoria's major rivers. A state of emergency was declared with State Emergency Service crews arriving from Queensland, South Australia, and Tasmania. In Skipton in the state's Western District, 20 properties were put on evacuation alert, while in the Central Highlands 120 people sought refuge in the town hall at Creswick and 30 people were evacuated from a caravan park in Clunes. In northern Victoria, 150 extra police and 50 military personnel were deployed to assist with evacuations and sandbagging.

=== September 8–23 ===
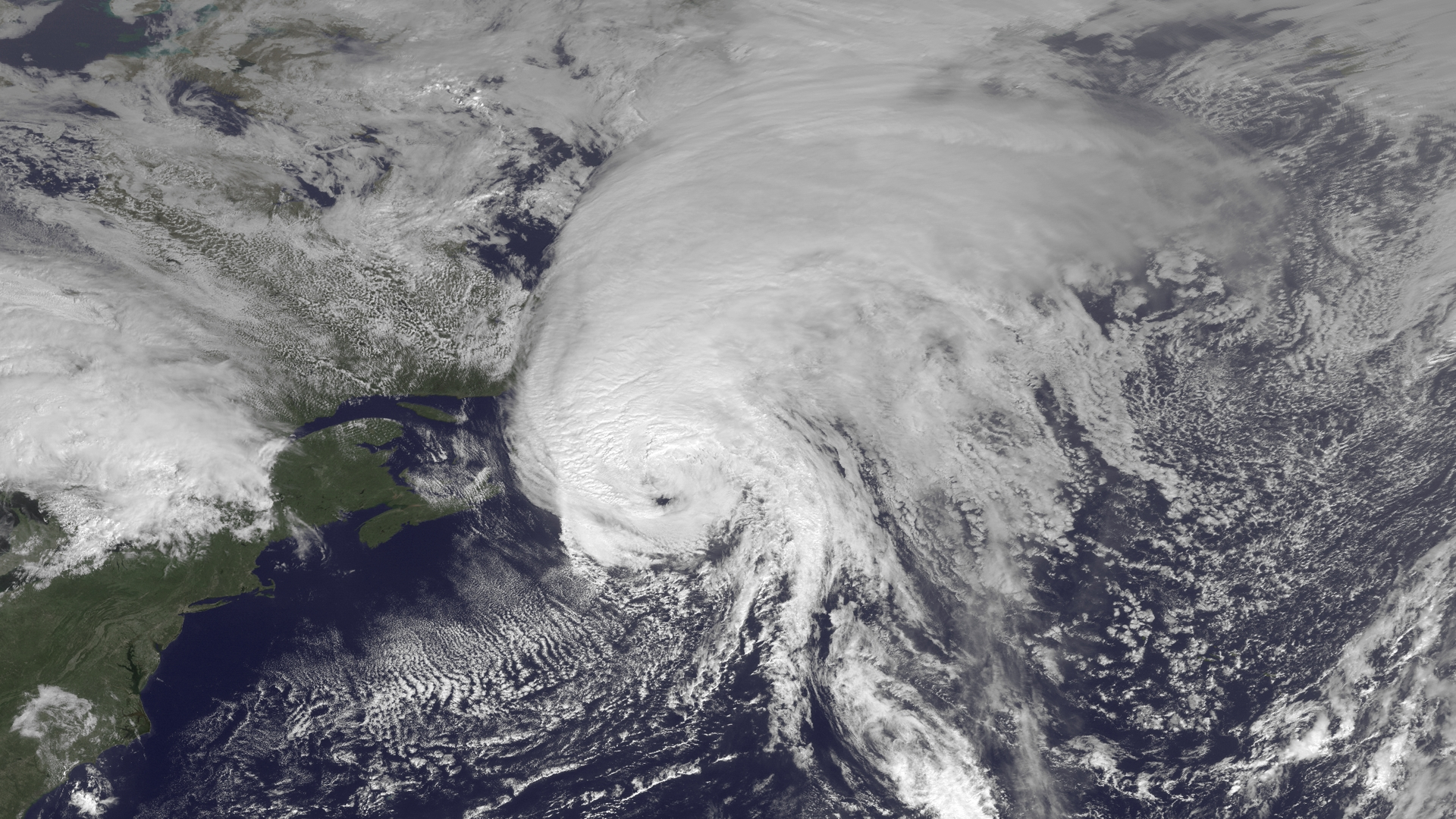
The eyewall of Hurricane Igor east of Cape Race, Newfoundland

Although Hurricane Igor was several hundred miles from the Leeward Islands on September 9, large swells produced by Igor swept two people out to sea in the U.S. Virgin Islands and Puerto Rico.

Since the storms started on September 9, 144 people were killed and 13,000 affected people were moved to temporary relief shelters. Five of El Salvador's fourteen departments were still seeing heavy rainfall. More than 20 homes were destroyed, 24 bridges and 1,600 houses were damaged, as the town of San Vicente (48 kilometres (30 mi) east of San Salvador) was buried under landslides on November 11, killing several people.

Mexico experienced its worst rainy season on record starting beginning on September 10. Mexico's President Felipe Calderón said that 900,000 people were affected in the latest tropical storms. It was the worst such event since Hurricane Alex killed 22 and left 40,000 homeless in July 2010.

September 13, 2010 saw Tropical Storm Julia hit the Cape Verde Islands with winds at 65 kilometres per hour (40 mph).

=== September 14–18 ===
==== September 14–18: Asia ====
A record cloudburst hit northern India on September 18 and 19, causing deadly flooding.

==== September 14–18: Europe ====
The 2010 Slovenian floods on the weekend of September 17–19 were caused by heavy rains in Slovenia, resulting in one of the worst floods in the country's history. Among the regions affected were the capital Ljubljana, the Central Sava Valley, Laško, the Slovenian Littoral and the Lower Carniola region. Initial damage was estimated to reach €15 million. Three people were killed.

On September 17, north-east England's firefighters, medics and emergency rescue teams did flood and rainstorm related training exercises at Hurworth Burn Reservoir, near Middleton St George in County Durham, as well as at Rothbury and Otterburn in Northumberland.

Three Spaniards died as heavy rains hit southern Spain on September 17. A man died when a wall collapsed in Bujalance in eastern Córdoba province, while a man and a woman died in Aguilar de la Frontera in the south of the province. Storm warnings were announced by the national weather authority later in the day.

==== September 14–18: Oceania ====
Heavy rainstorm and snowstorms hit Invercargill, New Zealand on September 16 and 17.

On September 18, heavy flooding closed a 100-metre (330 ft) stretch covered in water up to 1.5 metres (4.9 ft) deep on and off State Highway 1 north of Bulls as high winds and rain created major disturbances around the country. State Highway 3 was entirely closed and there were also landslips on State Highway 4 at the Manawatū Gorge. The NZ Transport Agency said State Highway 1 between Woodlands and Edendale in Southland had reopened after the ending of heavy snowfalls. Similar weather incidents and some minor car crashes closed parts of State Highway 99. Heavy floods under railway overbridge closed the highway near Marton, forcing a local diversion.

Powerco restored supply to around 28,000 customers as a severe wind and rain storm continued to pound the North Island. The storm had caused power cuts to around 45,000 customers through the middle of the North Island; the worst affected areas were Thames, Coromandel, Thames-Coromandel, Tīrau and Putāruru, parts of the western Bay of Plenty, parts of Whanganui, Wairarapa, and Manawatū, Hauraki-Piako, and parts of Taranaki.

Overnight between September 17 and 18, snow and ice settled on Southland's roads causing slippery conditions on rural roads and treacherous conditions in Invercargill as the local police asked people to stay indoors and off the roads. Hundreds of cars were damaged or destroyed nationwide. A big tree fell on State Highway 5, the Napier-Taupo Road, about 3 kilometres (1.9 mi) on the Napier side of the Tarawera Tavern. Sheep died in the worst winter since 1996.

The MetService reported more than 100 lightning strikes in the Hutt Valley and Wairarapa region yesterday, setting fire to a shed and igniting several trees early in the day.

WeatherWatch.co.nz reported that some gusts had peaked at 154 kilometres per hour (96 mph), collapsing power lines and cutting electricity in Warkworth, Remuera, Māngere and West Auckland. The electricity supply line company Vector believes about 30,000 people lost power in the Auckland area and in Piha to the west of the city.

=== September 19–22 ===
==== September 19–22: Americas ====
Bermuda International Airport and government-run schools in Bermuda were shut down on September 20 and 21 in anticipation of Hurricane Igor. Despite initial fears, the storm caused relatively minimal structural damage. Heavy rains fell across the islands between September 18 and 19, amounting to 75 mm (2.97 in); sustained winds were recorded over hurricane force and gusts reached 93 mph (150 km/h). An AWOS on St. David's Lighthouse recorded a peak sustained wind of 91 mph (146 km/h) and gusts of 117 mph (188 km/h). Although roughly 27,500 of the 35,000 residences across the island were without power, there were no reports of deaths or serious injuries after the storm's passage. Officials in Bermuda stated that the biggest loss from Igor would be lessened tourism revenue following a mass exodus prior to the hurricane's arrival.

==== September 19–22: Asia ====
September 19 saw thirteen more people perish in Uttar Pradesh because of the Yamuna river floods. The maximum temperature in the capital city of New Delhi rose to 34.6 °C (94.3 °F). Food prices rose because of the destroyed farmland. On September 20, heavy rain and landslides killed 63 in Uttarakhand. The river Ganges flooded several low-lying areas as it passed 2 metres (6.6 ft) above the danger mark in Haridwar, as Har-Ki-Puari was completely submerged underneath the floodwaters. The state-run rescue operation to the region said that seven people were still trapped under the debris of flattened houses. All the schools in the province were closed for three days.

On September 22, the Yamuna river flooded the Yamuna Sports Complex and left mosquito-attracting pools of floodwater, further disrupting preparations for the Commonwealth Games.

==== September 19–22: Europe ====
On September 22, after a night of steady rainfall Strathclyde Fire and Rescue received 117 calls about flooding in Kilbirnie, Glengarnock, Fairlie, and Largs in North Ayrshire, Scotland. There were similar downpours in parts of Northumberland and Cumbria. At one point later in the day, 65 firefighters were called to flooding in the Rothesay and Helensburgh areas of Argyll and Bute.

==== September 19–22: Oceania ====
On September 19, the roof of the 2,000 seat Stadium Southland tennis stadium in Invercargill, New Zealand collapsed and imploded after a storm dumped a near-record amount of snow on it during a tennis match. In contrast, in Christchurch the weather was sunny, with a temperature of 15 °C (59 °F). Similar automotive incidents closed most of State Highway 99 as 10 centimetres (3.9 in) of snow hit Invercargill that day and blocked most of its streets. The airport was closed and Air New Zealand crews were sent home. Overnight snowfalls hit Lumsden and Queenstown for the second night running.

Heavy snow destroyed a 1,000-square-metre (11,000 sq ft) glasshouse at Eldon Gardens, Donald McDonald's drive in Tweed St, killing 2,000 young tomato plants. The snowfall in Invercargill was about 10–14 cm (3.9–5.5 in) deep, and was probably the worst in the town for at least 50 years.

=== September 23–25 ===
==== September 23–25: Asia ====
September 23 saw northern India's storm devastating railways with 22 Delhi (inbound and outbound) trains canceled and another 65 diverted due to the severe flooding in Delhi as the river Yamuna reached the 207.06-metre (679.3 ft) danger mark. The Old Yamuna Bridge between East Delhi and New Delhi was closed for safety reasons as the Yamuna river's level rose menacingly. Residents in low-lying areas were evacuated to shelters in New Delhi. The Yamuna river reached a record high above the 151-metre (495 ft) danger mark in the worst monsoon rains for 30 years, leaving mosquito-attracting pools and coming dangerously near the Taj Mahal; more water was discharged from the Gokul and Okhla barrages.

==== September 24–25: Europe ====
In Scotland, Grampian Police warned of treacherous conditions as flooding hit Aberdeenshire and Aberdeen on September 23. Local residents were evacuated as the River Deveron and Aberdeenshire river rose to danger levels. Parts of North Ayrshire, Glasgow, Lothian, and Argyll and Bute were also affected. The Met Office said that 37 millimetres (1.5 in) of rain had fallen in 12 hours overnight; Glasgow normally has 95 millimetres (3.7 in) of rain in all of September. September 24 and 25 also saw patches of heavy rain hit various parts of Ireland, Belgium, and the Netherlands.

=== September 26–30 ===
==== September 26–30: Africa ====
In Hadejia and Kararar Rima, Nigeria, the flood victims slept wherever they could; the men searched for dry spots on the roads, while women and children kept piling into the houses still standing, as huge numbers of displaced people returned to flood-hit villages in northern Nigeria. Over two million people were affected by the flood waters and more than fifty thousand families were made homeless. Most of the houses were made of clay, so they dissolved in the flood waters.

==== September 26–30: Americas ====
The Mississippi river started to rise and threatened St. Paul, Minnesota, with Mayor Chris Coleman declaring an emergency. The previous week's rain caused the Minnesota and Mississippi rivers to reach flood levels.

==== September 26–30: Asia ====
September 26 saw heavy rain (causing more massive flooding) moving into Bihar and devastating an area around Patna. The Danapur Diyara district was the worst affected. The river Ganges breached its banks and flooded all low-lying areas, leaving many stranded due to flooded roads, collapsed bridges, and precautionary closures.

September 27 and 28 saw the flood situation reaching its worst at Agra where the river water level touched 152.4 metres (500 ft). Many neighborhoods and ghats, such as the Taj Ganj cremation ghat, were submerged after several thunderstorms brought heavy rainfall. Almost half of the city was without drinking water. Tourists visiting the Taj Mahal were asked to stay away from the raging river. Settlements in the Balkeshwar and Dayalbagh areas were inundated. More than 30 villages in the Bah tehsil were also badly hit by the Yamuna river floods.

==== September 26–30: Oceania ====
In Waikato, people started preparing for floods as heavy rain threatened to push already-swollen rivers past their limits. Preparations were made for the worst as the region had already been hit by a storm the previous week. While further rain did fall, the most serious flooding at the start of October 2010 turned out to be south of Waikato in the central region of New Zealand.

== October ==
=== October 23–28: North America ===
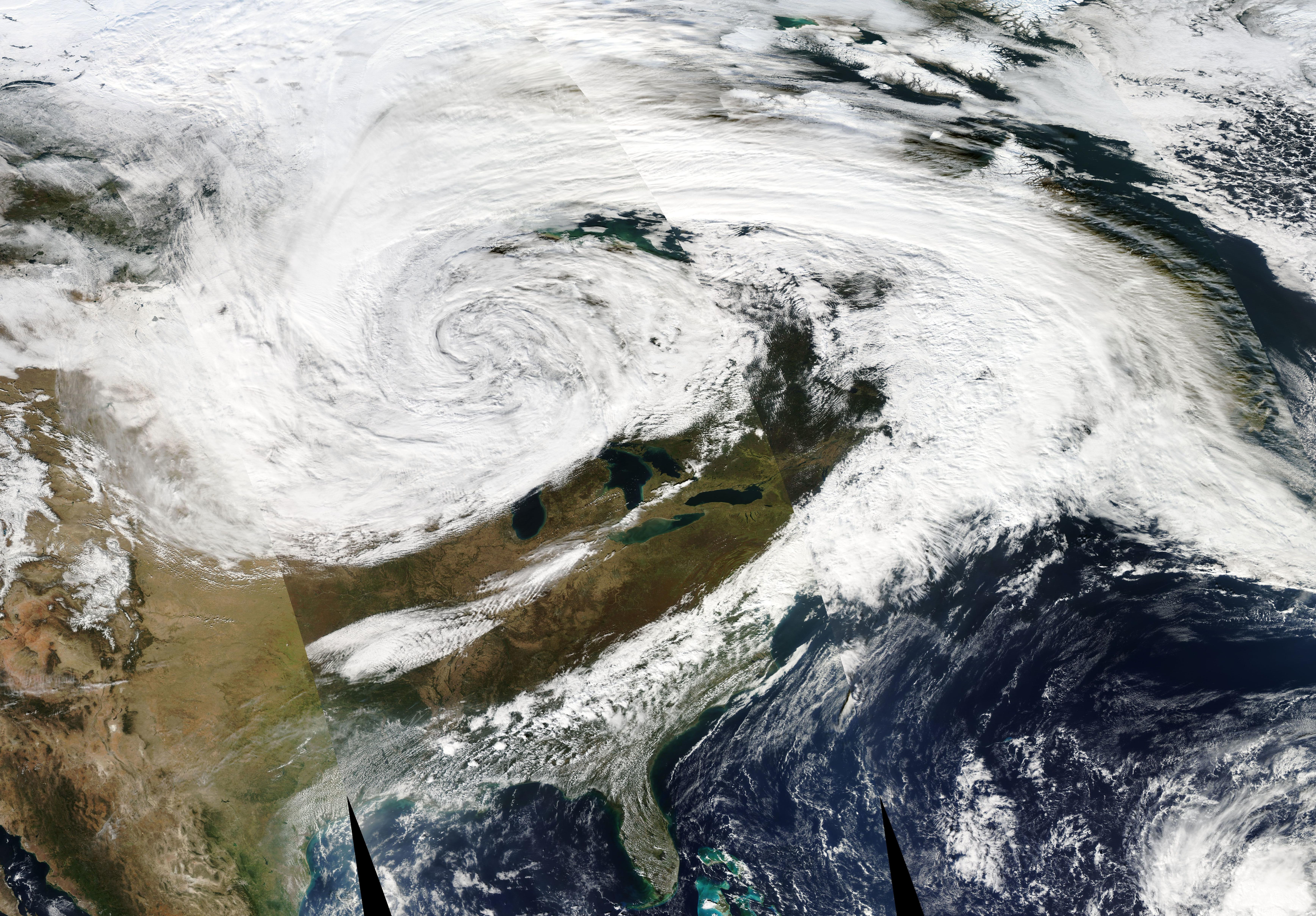
Satellite image of the storm complex at peak intensity, on October 27, 2010

== December ==
=== December 5–29: North America ===
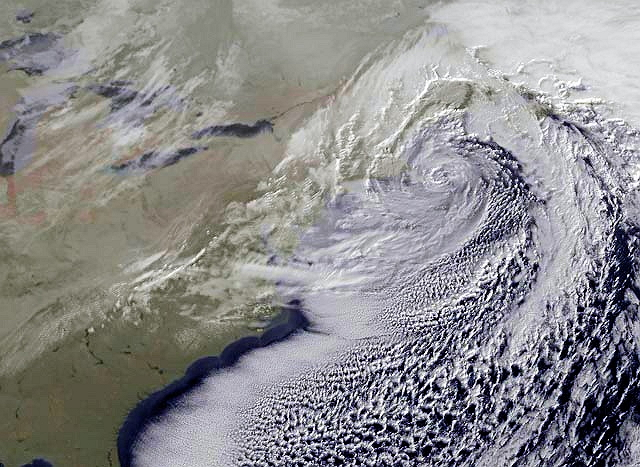
Visible satellite imagery of the nor'easter offshore Cape Cod at peak intensity, on the morning of December 27

== Gallery ==
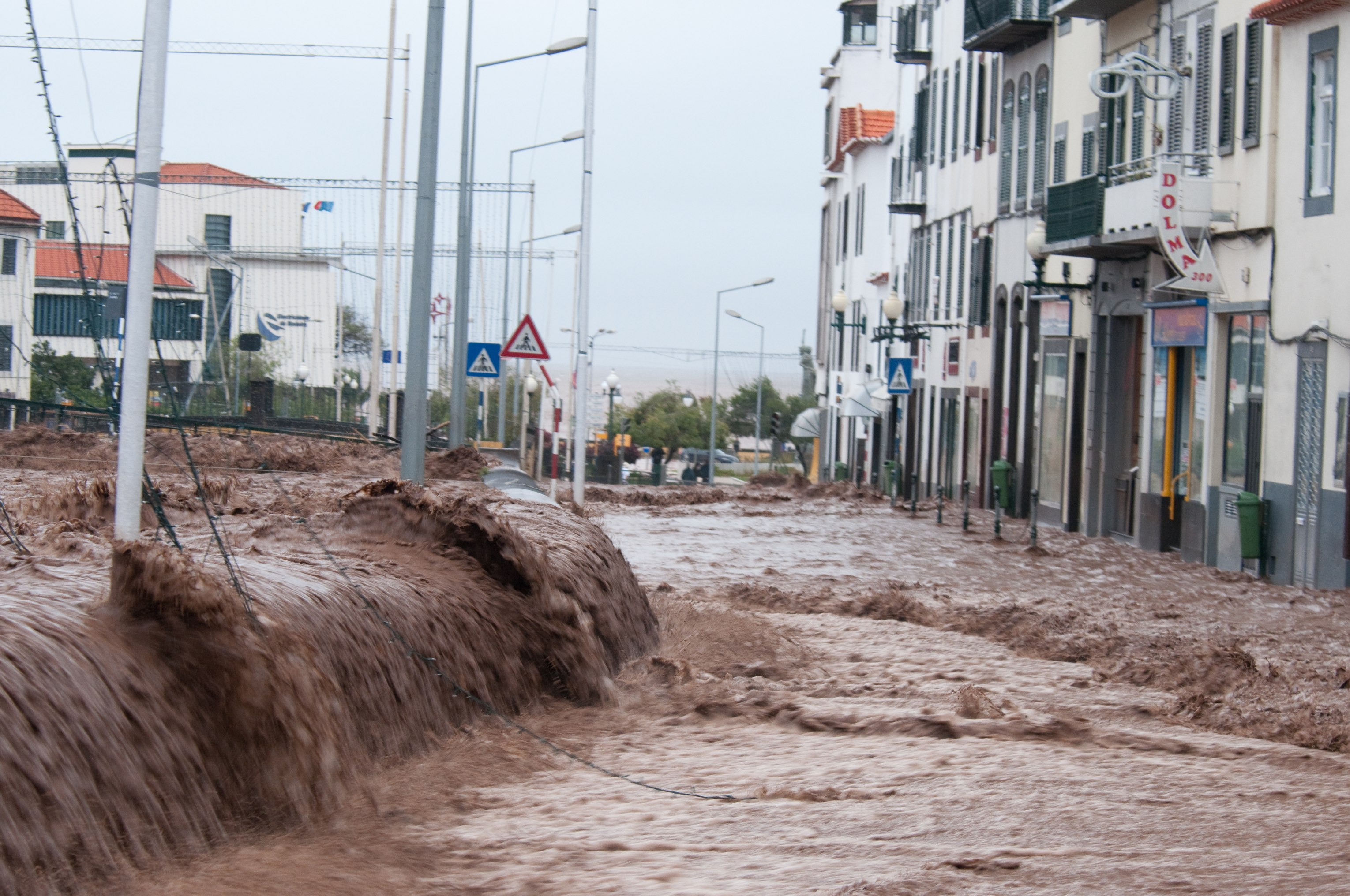
Flooding in Funchal in 2010.

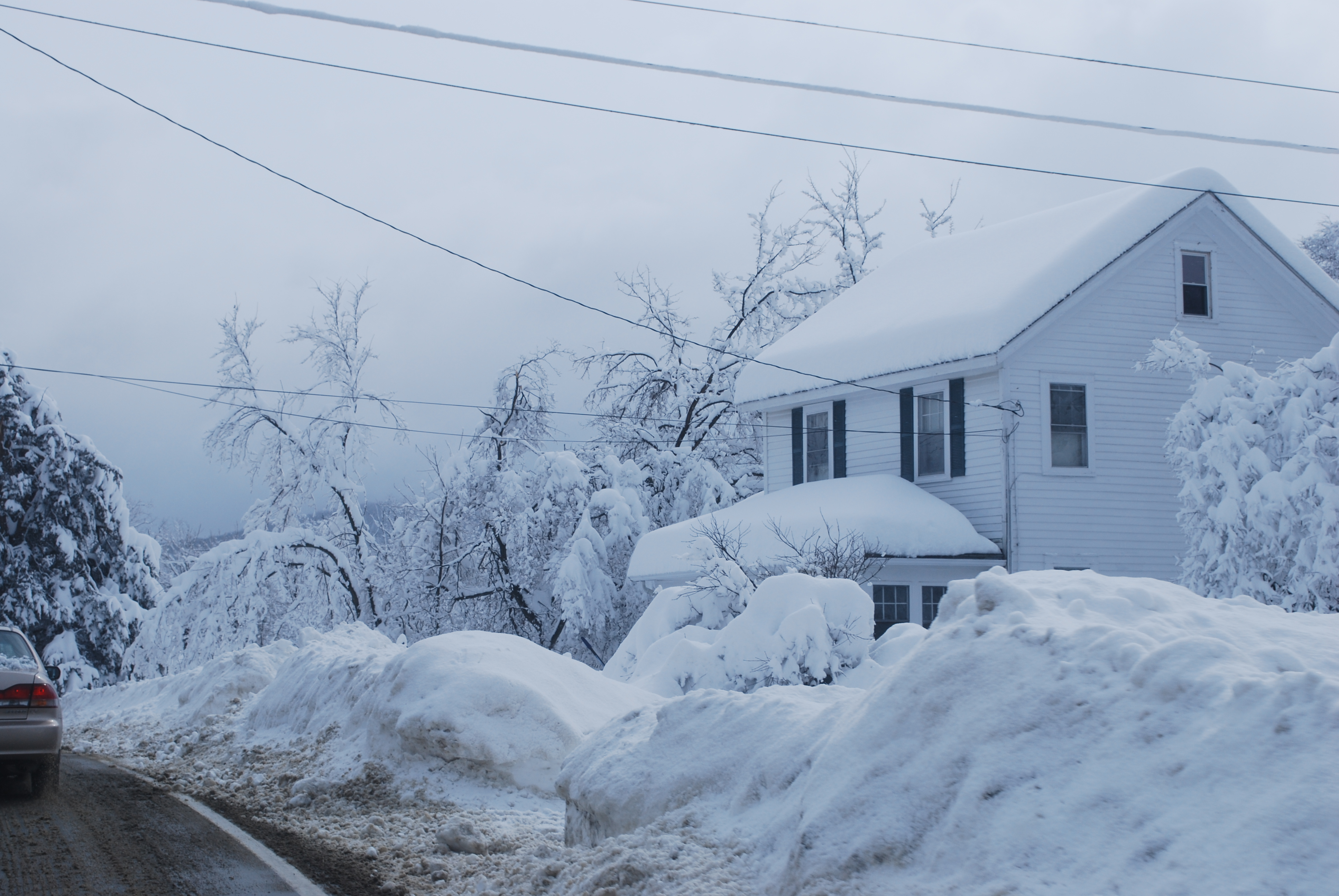
Snowfall in Dutchess County, New York on February 26, 2010

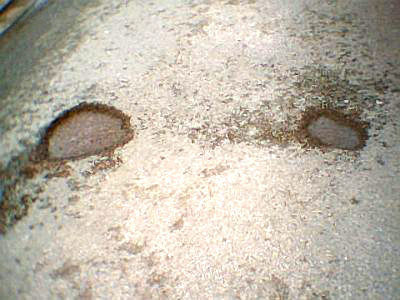
The Banbury Cake and The Banbury Review newspapers did an exposé on the weather-induced potholes during the second week of January 2010.

The Banbury Cake and The Banbury Review newspapers did an exposé on the weather-induced potholes during the second week of January 2010.

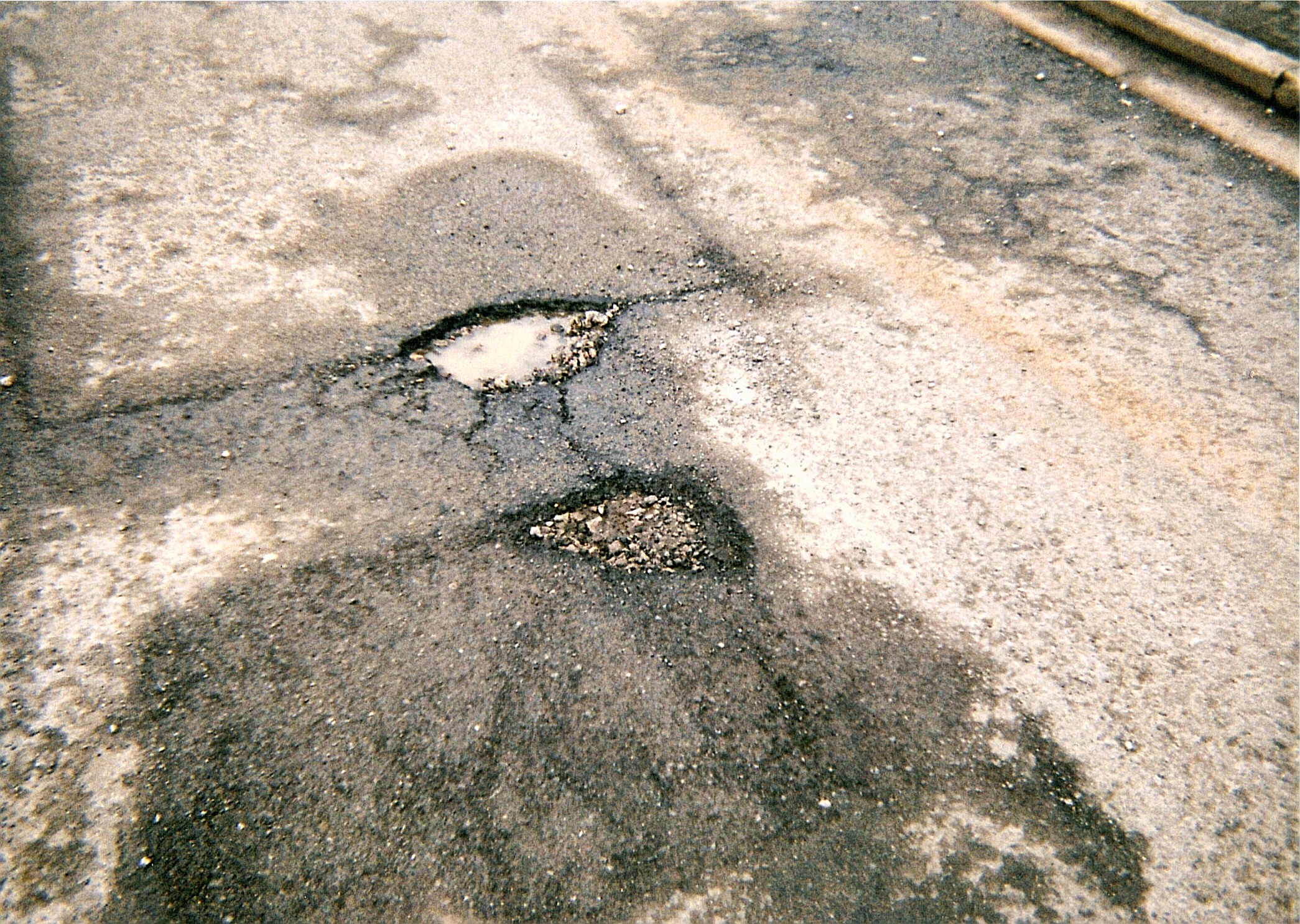
The Banbury Cake and The Banbury Review newspapers did an exposé on the weather-induced potholes during the second week of January 2010.

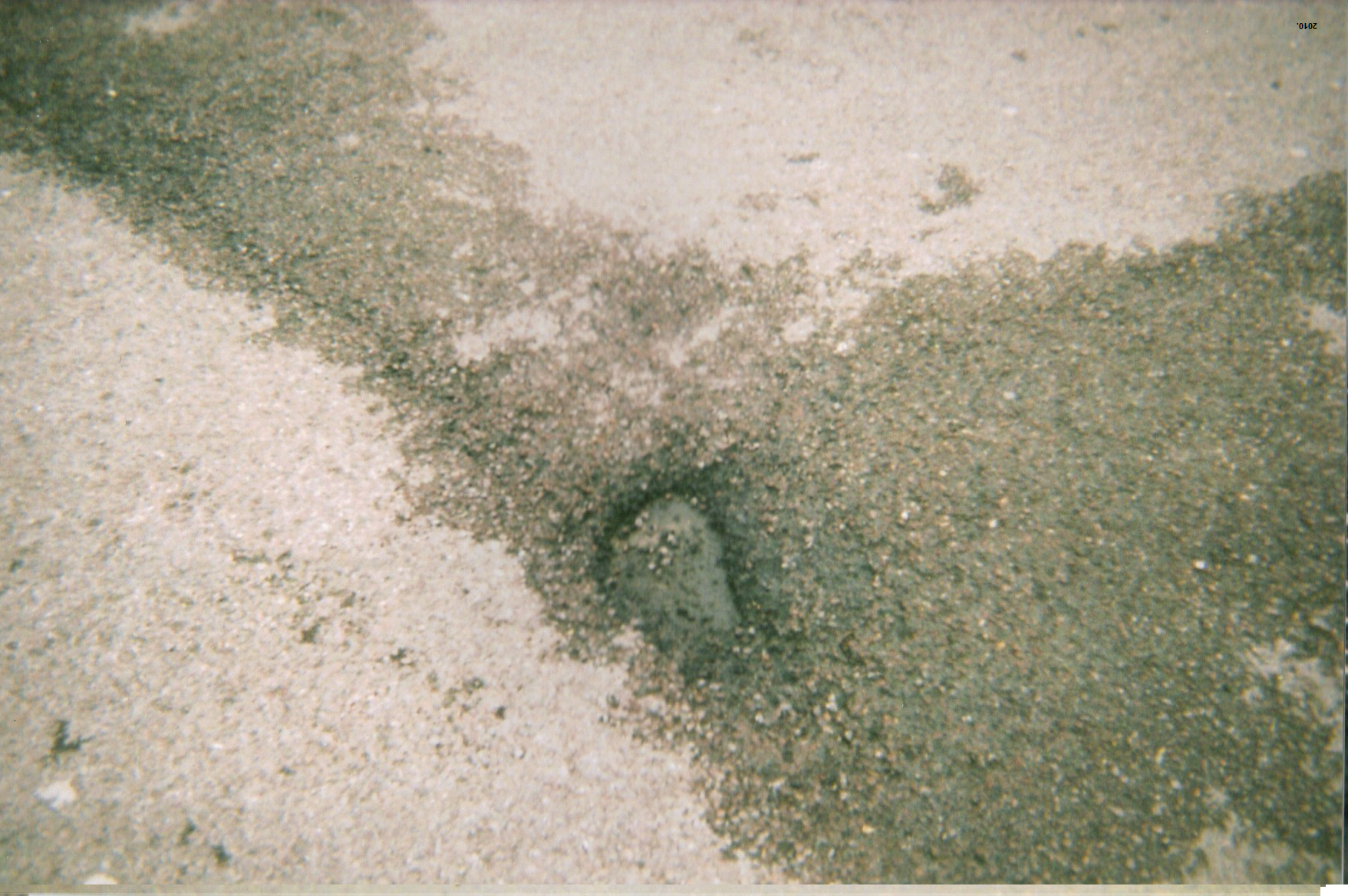
The Banbury Cake and The Banbury Review newspapers did an exposé on the weather-induced potholes during the second week of January 2010.

== See also ==
- 2009–10 Australian region cyclone season
- 2009–10 North American winter
- 2009–10 South Pacific cyclone season
- 2009–10 South-West Indian Ocean cyclone season
- 2010 Atlantic hurricane season
- 2010 Central European floods
- 2010 eruptions of Eyjafjallajökull
- 2010 North Indian Ocean cyclone season
- 2010 Northern Hemisphere summer heat waves
- 2010 Pacific hurricane season
- 2010 Pacific typhoon season
- 2010 Pakistan floods
- 2010 Romanian floods
- 2010 Slovenia floods
- 2010 Var floods
- 2010 Victorian floods
- 2010 Victorian storms in Australia
- 2010 Western Australian storms in Earth's Southern Hemisphere
- 2010–11 Australian region cyclone season
- 2010–11 North American winter
- 2010–11 South Pacific cyclone season
- 2010–11 South-West Indian Ocean cyclone season
- 2013–14 North American winter
- Arctic dipole anomaly
- Arctic oscillation
- Cyclogenesis
- Early 2014 North American cold wave
- El Niño-Southern Oscillation
- February 2009 Great Britain and Ireland snowfall
- Floods in 2010
- Global storm activity of 2009
- Gulf Stream
- Jet stream
- North Atlantic oscillation
- Pacific–North American teleconnection pattern
- Tornadoes of 2010
- Tropical cyclones in 2010
- Wildfires of 2010
- Winter of 1946–47 in the United Kingdom
- Winter of 1962–63 in the United Kingdom
- Winter of 1990–91 in Western Europe
- Winter of 2009–10 in Europe
- Winter storm
- Winter storms of 2009–10 in East Asia
- 2009–10 North American winter

Global weather by year
Preceded by 2009	Weather of 2010	Succeeded by 2011
