= Pacific Meridional Mode =

Climate mode in the North Pacific

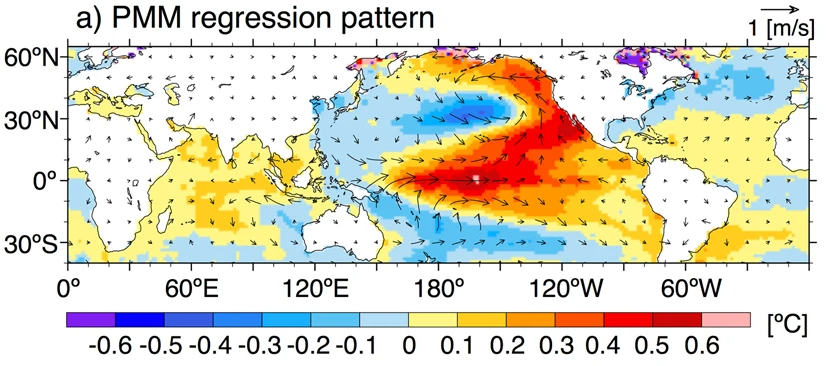
The SST and wind anomalies of the PMM positive phase

Pacific Meridional Mode (PMM) is a climate mode in the North Pacific. In its positive state, it is characterized by the coupling of weaker trade winds in the northeast Pacific Ocean between Hawaii and Baja California with decreased evaporation over the ocean, thus increasing sea surface temperatures (SST); and the reverse during its negative state. This coupling develops during the winter months and spreads southwestward towards the equator and the central and western Pacific during spring, until it reaches the Intertropical Convergence Zone (ITCZ), which tends to shift north in response to a positive PMM.

The North Pacific Oscillation (NPO) and the "North American Dipole"—two climate oscillations over the North Pacific and North America—trigger PMM modes during winter. Temperature fluctuations in the North Atlantic and the West Pacific oceans and changes in Arctic sea ice have also been proposed as triggers for PMM events.

The PMM is not the same thing as the El Niño-Southern Oscillation (ENSO), but there is evidence that PMM events can trigger ENSO events, especially Central Pacific El Niño events. The PMM state can also modulate hurricane activity in the East Pacific and typhoon activity in the West Pacific oceans and alter precipitation on the continents surrounding the Pacific Ocean. The South Pacific Ocean has a PMM-like mode known as the "South Pacific Meridional Mode" (SPMM) that also influences the ENSO cycle.

In the early 21st century, the intensity of the 2014–16 El Niño event and the highly active 2018 Pacific hurricane and typhoon seasons have been attributed to positive PMM events. With anthropogenic global warming, PMM activity is likely to increase, and some scientists have proposed that a loss of Antarctic and especially Arctic sea ice will induce future positive PMM events.

== Concept ==
The existence and properties of the Pacific Meridional Mode were proposed by Chiang and Vimont in 2004. The Pacific Meridional Mode is a form of coupled variability between the latitude of the Intertropical Convergence Zone (ITCZ) and north–south sea surface temperature (SST) gradients in the subtropical Pacific Ocean. Anomalies in the temperature gradient induce shifts in the ITCZ's position, which in turn alters wind-surface heat flux processes that modify the SST structure. Specifically, weaker trade winds are coupled to warm SST anomalies in the North Pacific—in particular along the California coast and between Hawaii and Western North America— focused on the subtropical Pacific, while cold SST anomalies lie in the East Tropical Pacific. The weaker trade winds correspond to southwesterly wind anomalies and mean reduced evaporative cooling, and the ITCZ is displaced northward. Mathematically, the PMM is often defined by maximum covariance analysis of three-month mean SST and wind anomalies in the central and eastern Pacific, with a focus on the northern hemisphere (20°S-30°N, 175°E-85°W) and by removing the ENSO index through linear regression.

The PMM is most intense during the months of January through May. Wind anomalies peak in February and SST anomalies in March. The PMM responses tend to persist into late summer and autumn through interactions with the ITCZ, which reaches its highest latitude and thus strongest interaction with the PMM during these seasons.

Generally, the PMM does not extend farther south than the ITCZ and thus tends not to reach the equator as the ITCZ is normally in the northern hemisphere. This is because the wind-SST feedback operates mostly when the wind anomaly is opposite to the climatological mean wind. This is not the case south of the ITCZ where mean winds come from the south. It is also a primarily ocean mixed layer process, with oceanic dynamics playing a minor role.

=== Other modes ===
In the North Pacific Ocean, the "Victoria mode" is another SST pattern that extends across the entire North Pacific, unlike the more regionally limited PMM which has been described as the eastern part of the Victoria mode. The distinction is that the Victoria mode is an SST pattern while the PMM is an SST-wind coupling pattern, and the Victoria Mode may be a more reliable predictor of ENSO than PMM according to Ren et al. 2023. Another North Pacific climate oscillation, the "North Pacific Mode", resembles the PMM.

The PMM is distinct from the El Niño–Southern Oscillation (ENSO), which is the principal climate variation in the Pacific Ocean. The two climate modes are not easily separated, however, and they both act to induce decadal climate variations in the Pacific. Separating the Pacific decadal oscillation/Interdecadal Pacific oscillation from PMM is also difficult.

== Triggers ==
The PMM appears to be mainly a consequence of stochastic (random) climate forcing in the extratropics albeit with influence from the atmospheric background state. The North Pacific Oscillation (NPO)—the atmospheric counterpart of the North Pacific Gyre Mode— can trigger PMM events mainly via SST anomalies off the coast of Baja California. The mid-latitude jet stream and, according to Tseng et al. 2020, the East Asian winter monsoon can modulate the NPO-PMM connection.

Warming of the North Atlantic Ocean can favour the onset of negative PMM through Rossby waves generated above the Atlantic Warm Pool. These spread eastward into the Pacific, where they trigger northerly winds that subsequently influence the ocean state. Such warming occurs both as part of the positive state of the Atlantic Multidecadal Oscillation and of the negative state of the so-called "North Atlantic Tripole". The negative "North Atlantic Tripole" state features warm SST anomalies in the subpolar and tropical and cold SST anomalies in the subtropical North Atlantic. This last interaction has become important since the 1990.

The "North American Dipole" is an alternating pattern of atmospheric pressure anomalies over North America, with positive anomalies over the Caribbean and its surroundings and negative anomalies over the Labrador Sea, that is strongest during winter. A positive North American Dipole is often associated with the development of a positive PMM during the subsequent spring. This occurs via the Atlantic and East Pacific Oceans, being cooled or warmed by the positive North American Dipole. The cooling Tropical Atlantic induces anticyclonic airflow anomalies over the East Pacific, which in turn oppose the trade winds and trigger a positive PMM.

Other mechanisms have been described:

- According to Park et al. 2018, SST anomalies over the Western Hemisphere Warm Pool modulate PMM onset in late summer.
- An eastward extension of the Kuroshio Extension has been related to PMM development by Joh and Di Lorenzo in 2019 and may be part of a decade-long pattern of climate oscillation in the Pacific, in the form of atmospheric pressure anomalies that travel counterclockwise around the North Pacific.
- According to Chen, Yu and Wen (2014), the spring Arctic Oscillation can trigger SST anomalies that resemble those of PMM and the PMM may be the pathway through which the Arctic Oscillation influences ENSO events.
- Zhou, Yang and Zheng (2017) proposed that an increased latitude of the West Pacific Warm Pool can trigger negative PMM events through changes in trade winds and SST gradients.
- Pausata et al. (2020) found a development of positive PMM conditions in response to volcanic eruptions in the northern hemisphere tropics.
- Simon Wang, Jiang and Fosu (2015) proposed that ENSO triggering can occur through an Indian Ocean-West Pacific-PMM route, but the mechanism is unclear.
- Cao et al. (2021) proposed that increased snow cover over North America can trigger a negative PMM-like teleconnection.
- Lin et al. (2021) indicated that the solar cycle modifies the PMM, with an active Sun favouring a positive PMM state and an inactive one a negative PMM.
- Cai et al. (2022) proposed that increased snow cover over the Tibetan Plateau in winter can induce strengthening trade winds over the eastern subtropical Pacific, causing a negative PMM state. This process is mediated through tropospheric temperature anomalies that are transported by the jet stream to the Pacific that influence the NPO. This relationship has become established in the 2000s, presumably due to Pacific decadal oscillation and Atlantic multidecadal oscillation state changes.
- Zhang et al. (2022) stated that the NPO is too limited to the extratropics to drive a PMM-like variability, which would instead be mainly controlled by variability of the Aleutian Low.

There is little study on whether ENSO induces PMM changes with research in 2011, 2018 and 2023 suggesting that positive ENSO events could trigger negative PMM events and less commonly, negative ENSO events positive PMM events, while Capotondi et al. (2019) proposed that SST anomalies in the west-central Pacific can induce warming along the West Coast resembling that of the PMM.

== Growth and demise ==
Progression of a PMM event in 2014-2015

Variations in the strength of the North Pacific High due to extratropical climate variability (e.g. the North Pacific Oscillation [NPO] in winter) induce changes in the strength of the trade winds. Anomalies in their strength alter surface heat fluxes over the sea, causing SST changes that peak in spring and spread southwestward. This process, when triggered by NPO variations during winter, is known as the "seasonal footprinting mechanism", and it involves positive NPO anomalies weakening the trade winds. According to Wu et al. (2009), the decreased evaporation occurs southwest of the original SST anomaly because of the easterly trade winds, and thus the SST anomaly tends to spread southwestward while ocean transportation changes cause a northward movement. Particularly in the northwest Tropical Pacific, increased insolation during spring facilitates the growth of PMM events.

Cross-equatorial winds triggered by temperature gradients between the hemisphere facilitate the development of the PMM. As they cross the equator, the Coriolis force deflects them into a direction opposite to that of the trade winds, weakening them. In turn, the ~PMM facilitates the development of cross-equatorial winds, generating a positive feedback, especially since the cross-equatorial winds act to trigger a cooling response in the southern hemisphere and according to Wu et al. (2009) along the equator.

Cloud albedo feedbacks enhance the growth of the PMM, while ocean transport hinders it. According to Wu et al. (2009), turbulent heat fluxes act to dissipate the originating SST anomaly. After August, westerly winds south of the ITCZ act to dissipate SST anomalies.

== Effects ==
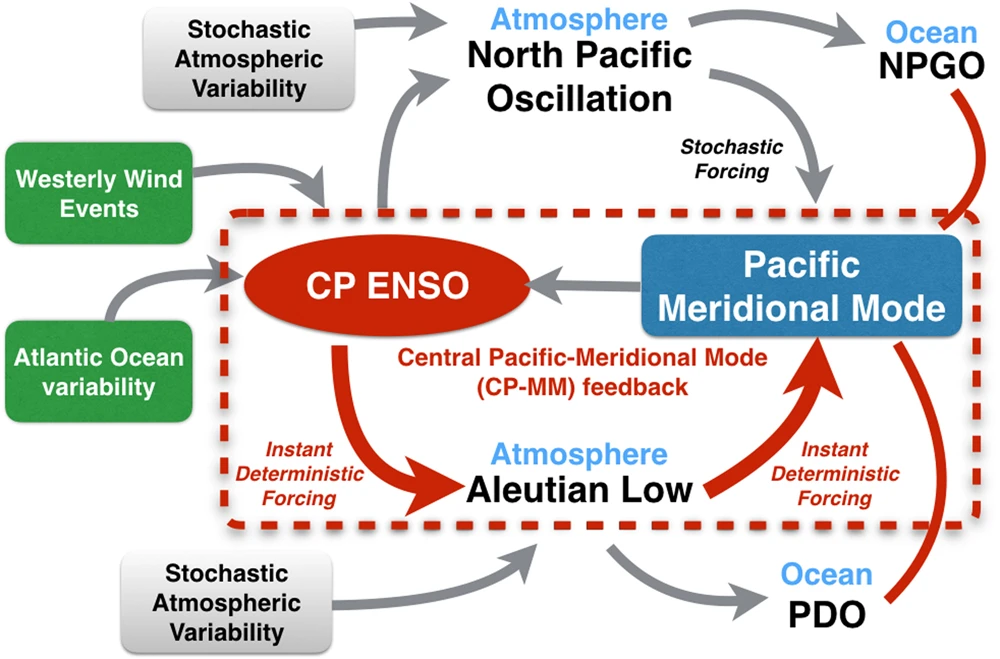
Teleconnections of PMM

The PMM is the major pathway through which the extratropics influence tropical climate in the Pacific Ocean. PMM variations influence tropical cyclone activity in the Pacific and Atlantic Oceans.

Among the phenomena associated with the PMM are:

- A PMM event in 2014 significantly influenced the 2013–2015 North Pacific marine heatwave, which had significant impacts on the ocean off the west coast of North America. Amaya et al. (2020) proposed that a positive PMM state in 2019 similarly enhanced the 2019 North Pacific marine heatwave through an ITCZ shift and resulting alterations in the atmospheric circulation. Vice versa, Chen, Shi and Lin (2021) proposed that certain "blob" events can trigger a positive PMM.
- The PMM-like coupling between SST and wind anomalies may control the mean latitude of the ITCZ.
- The PMM may act to dampen low-frequency climate variations in the tropics.
- Positive PMM weakens the West Pacific subtropical anticyclone.
- The PMM may alter the behaviours of the East Pacific oxygen minimum zones.

Other suggested correlations:

- Muñoz, Wang and Enfield (2010) identified a teleconnection from the PMM to the spring SSTs in the Gulf of Mexico and the Caribbean.
- Lu et al. (2017) have related the intensity of the so-called "Mid-Atlantic Trough", an upper-atmosphere trough over the North Atlantic Ocean that influences hurricane activity and extratropical weather, to PMM-like SST anomalies; a more intense Mid-Atlantic Trough is associated with a negative PMM state.
- Promchote et al. (2018) have correlated the occurrence of severe weather during winter (cold waves) in Taiwan to positive PMM stages.
- Bonino et al. (2019) found a correlation between upwelling in the California Current and negative PMM, and a similar pattern between the Humboldt current and the SPMM.
- Dias, Cayan and Gershunov (2019) correlated the PMM to winter temperatures in California.
- Kodera et al. (2019) described temperature and wind anomalies in the lower stratosphere related to the PMM.
- Liguori and Di Lorenzo (2019) identified the PMM as a major factor in interannual Pacific variability.
- Tuo, Yu and Hu (2019) discovered that PMM modulated the activity of mesoscale ocean eddies in the South China Sea, and its southern hemisphere equivalent, until 2004 when the relationship largely ceased.
- Long et al. (2020) found that positive PMM events lead to high sea levels near Hawaii, because of thermal expansion of the sea that accompanies SST anomalies. This took place during declining trade wind strength in 2020.
- According to Luo et al. (2020), Rossby waves (planetary waves) generated during a positive PMM event induce anticyclonic atmospheric circulation anomalies over China, characterized by descending air over eastern China and ascending air over northern China. This favours the onset of heat waves in eastern China.
- Meehl et al. (2021) proposed that heat accumulation in the West Pacific can force transitions of the Interdecadal Pacific oscillation through PMM-like patterns.
- Wang et al. (2021) observed a correlation between the longitude of the Pacific intraseasonal oscillation and the PMM.
- Rice yields across southeast Asia increase during years with positive PMM, according to Frazier et al. 2022.
- Hari et al. (2022) found a correlation between the positive PMM and a weaker Walker circulation.
- Hari et al. (2022) identified increased heat waves over India as a consequence of a positive PMM, which decreases cloud cover.
- Jeong et al. (2022) proposed that the strong decline of Arctic sea ice in 2012 was aided by a negative PMM during that year.
- Kao et al. (2022) identified a teleconnection between the PMM and NAO, which act as mutual positive feedback loops.
- Lim et al. (2022) proposed a linkage to global oceanic chlorophyll levels.
- Tsai, Wang and Tseng 2023 found a correlation between maximum temperatures in Taiwan and the PMM.

Whether the PMM has effects on the Madden–Julian oscillation or on equatorial Kelvin waves is largely unstudied, and any connection between PMM and the Indian Ocean Dipole is unclear.

=== Precipitation ===
The PMM alters precipitation in Asia. A circumglobal teleconnection influenced by the PMM and changes in atmospheric pressure systems alters precipitation in the Yellow River valley, and Rossby waves alter the precipitation in the Yangtze River valley of China as they emanate from the PMM region westward and interact with the jet stream. Precipitation increases in northern and southwestern China and declines over western-central China and the lower Yangtze River valley. According to Li and Ma (2011), PMM-induced ITCZ variations trigger the circumglobal teleconnection. Kao, Hung and Hong (2018) identified a correlation between precipitation over Taiwan and the PMM.

Interactions between PMM and the North Pacific High may be influenced by the hydroclimate of the Southwestern United States. Zhong, Liu and Notaro (2011) found that a positive PMM causes dry winters from the Great Plains into the Northeastern United States through a North Atlantic Oscillation-type teleconnection. During summer low atmospheric pressure over the Northern United States and high atmospheric pressure over the Eastern United States favour precipitation in the Midwestern United States. Gibson et al. (2020) found a correlation between PMM and the occurrence of a ridge off the West Coast of the United States, a pattern associated with droughts there. Son et al. (2021) proposed that the PMM is part of a cycle of climate variability in the North Pacific that imparts a 5-7 year long cycle to wildfire activity in California.

A positive correlation exists between precipitation in eastern and Amazonian South America and the PMM. This does not appear to be due entirely to atmospheric moisture transport, as precipitation increases even in parts of South America where moisture convergence declines, and the effect is much stronger during boreal summer. Seiler, Hutjes and Kabat (2013) did not find a correlation between Bolivian climate and the PMM.

Zhang, Villarini and Vecchi (2019) found that positive PMM causes drought over Australia and the Maritime Continent. This is mainly due to the excitation of ENSO variability by the PMM, which in turn induces anomalies in moisture transport, and has been proposed as a predictor of Australian droughts.

=== ENSO ===
Much of the attention directed at the PMM mode is due to its potential as a precursor of ENSO events. PMM events in spring are a major predictor of subsequent ENSO state. Mechanistically, PMM influences ENSO state through several pathways:

- The coupled wind and SST anomalies propagate towards the equator during spring and early summer.
- In early spring and winter, wind anomalies linked to PMM recharge subsurface heat at the equator, a process known as "trade wind charging".
- PMM events generate oceanic and off-equatorial Rossby waves and Kelvin waves, which in turn form equatorial Kelvin waves through wind curl anomalies along the equator.
- PMM-linked changes in the position of the ITCZ during summer and autumn influence equatorial climate.
- Chu et al. 2023 noted that the occurrence of near-equator tropical cyclones increases in the West Pacific during positive PMM events. These tropical cyclones can initiate ENSO development.

Positive PMM events result in wind and SST anomalies that resemble these preceding optimal El Niño conditions and westerly wind bursts, and also modulate sub-surface ocean heat content associated with El Niño development. They further suggest the PMM might influence the seasonality of El Niño events, as PMM events occur mainly during spring.

The PMM induces mainly warm events (El Niño) rather than cold events (La Niña) and it is a more reliable predictor of the former than the latter. As noted by Zheng et al. (2921), negative PMM events are not as effective at triggering La Niña as positive events are at triggering El Niño because the wind anomalies are weaker. The PMM appears to have a stronger effect on the central and western Pacific rather than the eastern Pacific and thus favours the development of Central Pacific El Niño (CP Niño or El Niño Modoki) events, although there is no clear consensus on this association. Zonal advection of SST anomalies from the central to the eastern Pacific may allow the PMM to induce canonical El Niño. You and Furtado (2018) proposed that mismatches between the northern and southern PMM prevent the development of canonical El Niño events while congruence favours it. Sanchez et al. (2020) have found that positive PMM events have usually preceded strong El Niño events since 1860. Wang and Wang (2013) defined CP El Niño I and II, the latter of which features SST anomalies similar to positive PMM. Cai, Wang and Santoso (2017) proposed that the unusually west-shifted warm SST anomalies during the 2014–16 El Niño event may have been a consequence of the positive PMM that year, and Paek, Yu and Qian (2017) explained the sustained SST anomalies in the central Pacific during that year with the prolonged positive PMM conditions. Stuecker (2018) proposed that CP Niño and PMM events are inherently coupled and enhance each other through teleconnections involving the Aleutian Low, and that there is no actual relationship between PMM and East Pacific El Niño.

The PMM also influences the end of an ENSO event, in particular the development of multi-year ENSO events. For La Niña, Park et al. (2020) proposed that the development of a negative PMM in the spring of the year following a La Niña is strongly correlated both in observations and models with the redevelopment of La Niña in the subsequent winter, while a positive PMM is associated with a single-year La Niña. He et al. (2020) identified the persistence of a positive PMM-like SST pattern as a mechanism that impedes the genesis of La Niña after a Central Pacific El Niño event. Park et al. (2021) proposed that during multi-year La Niña, the PMM hinders the recharge of heat in the West Pacific and thus allows the recurrence of La Niña. According to Shi et al. 2023, the extension of negative PMM associated SST anomalies helped maintain the 2020-23 La Niña.

Not all PMM events trigger subsequent ENSO events, a phenomenon that appears to be caused by varying SST patterns according to Zhao et al. (2020) In the so-called "East PMM" the SST anomalies stay off the equatorial Pacific and are flanked by cold SST anomalies in the tropical East Pacific and impede El Niño development, while in the "West PMM", they extend into the Western Pacific and trigger winds favourable to El Niño development. The source of this variance is unclear but may relate to forcings from the Atlantic Ocean and diversity in the North Pacific Oscillation. There appear to be decadal cycles in the PMM-ENSO teleconnection. The NPO can induce ENSO also through a separate pathway via West Pacific SST anomalies. Separating SST anomalies caused by ENSO from these caused by PMM can be difficult.

=== Tropical cyclones ===
Typhoon frequency is increased in the southeastern West Pacific during positive PMM years. This is due mainly to changes in vorticity and remotely forced changes in atmospheric parameters such as relative humidity and wind shear, which shift typhoon genesis east during positive and west during negative PMM events. It is also due to a more southeastward genesis location, however, which lengthens the time that typhoons have to intensify. Zhang et al. (2016) identified a positive correlation between West Pacific accumulated cyclone energy (ACE) and the PMM. Zuo et al. (2018) proposed that positive PMM events can facilitate an early onset of typhoon seasons through increased genesis in the eastern West Pacific. Gao et al. (2018) found an increased occurrence of intense typhoons during positive PMM years, both in absolute terms and relative to the average number of typhoons. The earliest typhoon genesis also occurs earlier in positive PMM years. The effect of PMM is seasonal, being concentrated mainly in spring and autumn while summer TC occurrence does not change. The changes in typhoon activity are induced mainly by the central tropical Pacific manifestation of PMM, not by the eastern subtropical Pacific manifestation, and also by Central Pacific El Niño events.

Zhan et al. (2017) correlated the frequent occurrence of intense typhoons in 1994, 2004, 2015 and 2016 with positive PMM events in those years. The numerous impacts of typhoons on Taiwan and different behaviour of the 2016 typhoon season compared to the 1998 typhoon season was due to the positive PMM state in 2016. A positive PMM event enhanced the 2018 Pacific hurricane season and the 2018 Pacific typhoon season that year, and during October of the 2020 Pacific typhoon season.

The effect of PMM also extends to the Atlantic and East Pacific:

- Positive PMM events are linked to higher SSTs, reduced wind shear and atmospheric pressure in the East Pacific, favouring hurricane events. Part—and according to Murakami et al. (2017)—most of the extreme activity of the 2015 Pacific hurricane season has been attributed to a positive PMM in that year. The 2018 Pacific hurricane season had the highest accumulated cyclone energy of all Pacific hurricane seasons in the satellite era and Wood et al. (2019) attributed some of that activity to a positive PMM event that year.
- In the Atlantic, Zhang et al. (2018) found that hurricane landfall frequency decreases after positive spring PMM events in the Caribbean, Florida and the Gulf of Mexico while the frequency of hurricanes increases in the East Atlantic. These variations are induced mostly through ENSO and include both changes in storm tracks and storm genesis.

== Similar phenomena in other oceans ==
Similar couple SST-wind anomalies have been documented in other oceans, such as the Indian Ocean, south Pacific Ocean and the south Atlantic Ocean, and are hypothesized to play a role in the onset of ENSO events. The Atlantic Ocean counterpart is known as the Atlantic Meridional Mode and operates similarly.

=== South Pacific Meridional Mode ===
The "South Pacific Meridional Mode" (SPMM) is an analogous climate mode in the south Pacific; Zhang, Clement and Di Nezio proposed its existence in 2014 and it operates in a nearly identical manner to the northern hemisphere PMM albeit according to You and Furtado (2018) with SST anomalies peaking during (austral) summer and wind anomalies during (austral) winter. According to Middlemas et al. (2019), cloud radiative feedbacks counteract the persistence of SPMM. The SPMM has been further related to a different climate mode known as the "South Pacific Quadrupole" and the "South Pacific subtropical dipole mode".

Unlike the PMM, the South Pacific Meridional Mode has a more extensive influence on the Pacific Ocean than the northern PMM, by impacting the equator instead of remaining within the southern hemisphere, for example, and favouring the onset of "canonical" East Pacific El Niño events instead of Central Pacific El Niño events like PMM. This is because the southern trade winds in the east Pacific cross the equator into the northern hemisphere and can thus "transport" the effects of the South Pacific Meridional Mode northward. Ocean dynamics in the cold tongue region may also play a role. The exact relation between SPMM and ENSO onset is still unclear. The failure of an expected El Niño event to develop in 2014 has been explained by an unfavourable state of the SPMM in that year. Apart from ENSO development, the SPMM has impacts on the Chilean Desventuradas Islands and Juan Fernandez Island according to Dewitte et al. (2021). Kim et al. (2022) proposed that cooling in the Southern Ocean can force a negative SPMM state.

== PMM variations ==
The activity of the PMM appears to fluctuate over decadal timescales. Decadal cycles in PMM strength may be a function of two-way interactions between the tropics and the extratropics.

PMM variability is not constant. Both the mean climate state—in particular the strength of the ocean surface heat flux variations caused by wind changes and the latitude of the ITCZ—and the storminess in the extratropics influence its variability. The ITCZ limits the extent of the PMM to the south, and fluctuations in the mean position of the ITCZ due to climate changes may thus impact the manifestation of the PMM. Simulations by Sanchez et al. (2019) found increased PMM variability both in response to volcanic eruptions, such as the 1257 Samalas eruption and in response to greenhouse gases. Decreased PMM activity during the mid-Holocene may explain the weaker ENSO variability during that time; such a decrease might have been induced by orbital forcing. Bramante et al. (2020) found positive PMM variations during the Medieval Climate Anomaly and negative PMM during the Little Ice Age and used it to explain changes in typhoon activity at Jaluit in the Marshall Islands and in the South China Sea.

There is evidence that PMM variability has increased between 1948 and 2018 which may not (yet) necessarily be a consequence of global warming. In recent decades, the connection between the PMM and NPO has increased. Increased PMM activity between 1982 and 2015 has suppressed ENSO variance and caused it to shift westward through an increased strength of southerly winds over the South Pacific.

Dima, Lohann and Rimbu (2015) proposed that the Great Salinity Anomaly in the North Atlantic after 1970 modified the Pacific climate through a positive PMM state and suggested that Heinrich events during the late Pleistocene may have caused a similar teleconnection. A more positive Atlantic Multidecadal Oscillation state after the 1990s may increase PMM variability by strengthening the North Pacific High and, according to Park et al. (2019), by increasing the moisture available over the Atlantic Warm Pool. Yu et al. (2015) argued that the increased PMM variability forced by the Atlantic Multidecadal Oscillation is responsible for the increased frequency of Central Pacific El Niño events after the 1990s.

=== PMM and anthropogenic climate change ===
Some climate models predict the feedback between wind and SST anomalies will increase because of anthropogenic climate change and thus PMM events will intensify, but other processes may enhance or counteract this process. Liguori and Lorenzo (2018) proposed the effect would become noticeable by 2020. Increased variance of the PMM has been used to explain the increased frequency of Central Pacific El Niño events during the few decades preceding 2020. According to Liguori and Lorenzo (2018) it may explain an increase in ENSO activity until 2100, perhaps beginning with the 2014–16 El Niño event, and increased tropics-extratropics coupling. Increased PMM activity would synchronize decadal climate variations in the Pacific and increase the occurrence of marine heatwaves both in and out of the North Pacific Ocean, with concomitant ecological impacts.

Fosu, He and Liguori (2020) proposed that increasing SSTs in the Atlantic and Indian Oceans can induce a negative PMM-like response in the Pacific Ocean, delaying the onset of ocean warming there. Long et al. (2020) simulated climate states in RCP8.5 and identified an increased occurrence of positive PMM events preceded by El Niño events. Tomas, Deser and Sun (2016) identified a positive PMM and SPMM pattern in models as a response to Arctic sea ice loss. Kim et al. (2020) found in simulations and observations that a reduction of Arctic sea ice in the Pacific sector of the Arctic Ocean can trigger positive PMM events through a NPO-like teleconnection, thus favouring the onset of Central Pacific El Niño events, and suggested that the increasing trend of central Pacific El Niño events may have been triggered by global warming since 1990. England et al. (2020) described the development of positive PMM and SPMM-like SST anomalies in response to a loss of Arctic and Antarctic sea ice in the late 21st century. Orihuela-Pinto et al. (2022) noted a weakening of PMM variability after a shutdown of the Atlantic meridional overturning circulation.

== Name and use ==
Chiang and Vimont (2004) coined the name "Pacific Meridional Mode" as an analogy to the "Atlantic Meridional Mode"; both refer to the north–south structure of the SST gradients and ITCZ latitude anomalies. It is sometimes known as the "North Pacific Meridional Mode" or "Tropical Pacific Meridional Mode".
