= Climate variability and change =

Change in the statistical distribution of climate elements for an extended period

Climate variability includes all the variations in the climate that last longer than individual weather events, whereas the term climate change only refers to those variations that persist for a longer period of time, typically decades or more. Climate change may refer to any time in Earth's history, but the term is now commonly used to describe contemporary climate change, often popularly referred to as global warming. Since the Industrial Revolution, the climate has increasingly been affected by human activities.

The climate system receives nearly all of its energy from the sun and radiates energy to outer space. The balance of incoming and outgoing energy and the passage of the energy through the climate system is Earth's energy budget. When the incoming energy is greater than the outgoing energy, Earth's energy budget is positive and the climate system is warming. If more energy goes out, the energy budget is negative and Earth experiences cooling.

The energy moving through Earth's climate system finds expression in weather, varying on geographic scales and time. Long-term averages and variability of weather in a region constitute the region's climate. Such changes can be the result of "internal variability", when natural processes inherent to the various parts of the climate system alter the distribution of energy. Examples include variability in ocean basins such as the Pacific decadal oscillation and Atlantic multidecadal oscillation. Climate variability can also result from external forcing, when events outside of the climate system's components produce changes within the system. Examples include changes in solar output and volcanism.

Climate variability has consequences for sea level changes, plant life, and mass extinctions; it also affects human societies.

== Terminology ==
Climate variability is the term to describe variations in the mean state and other characteristics of climate (such as chances or possibility of extreme weather, etc.) "on all spatial and temporal scales beyond that of individual weather events." Some of the variability does not appear to be caused by known systems and occurs at seemingly random times. Such variability is called random variability or noise. On the other hand, periodic variability occurs relatively regularly and in distinct modes of variability or climate patterns.

The term climate change is often used to refer specifically to anthropogenic climate change. Anthropogenic climate change is caused by human activity, as opposed to changes in climate that may have resulted as part of Earth's natural processes. Global warming became the dominant popular term in 1988, but within scientific journals global warming refers to surface temperature increases while climate change includes global warming and everything else that increasing greenhouse gas levels affect.

A related term, climatic change, was proposed by the World Meteorological Organization (WMO) in 1966 to encompass all forms of climatic variability on time-scales longer than 10 years, but regardless of cause. During the 1970s, the term climate change replaced climatic change to focus on anthropogenic causes, as it became clear that human activities had a potential to drastically alter the climate. Climate change was incorporated in the title of the Intergovernmental Panel on Climate Change (IPCC) and the UN Framework Convention on Climate Change (UNFCCC). Climate change is now used as both a technical description of the process, as well as a noun used to describe the problem.

== Causes ==
On the broadest scale, the rate at which energy is received from the Sun and the rate at which it is lost to space determine the equilibrium temperature and climate of Earth. This energy is distributed around the globe by winds, ocean currents, and other mechanisms to affect the climates of different regions.

Factors that can shape climate are called climate forcings or "forcing mechanisms". These include processes such as variations in solar radiation, variations in the Earth's orbit, variations in the albedo or reflectivity of the continents, atmosphere, and oceans, mountain-building and continental drift and changes in greenhouse gas concentrations. External forcing can be either anthropogenic (e.g. increased emissions of greenhouse gases and dust) or natural (e.g., changes in solar output, the Earth's orbit, volcano eruptions). There are a variety of climate change feedbacks that can either amplify or diminish the initial forcing. There are also key thresholds which when exceeded can produce rapid or irreversible change.

Some parts of the climate system, such as the oceans and ice caps, respond more slowly in reaction to climate forcings, while others respond more quickly. An example of fast change is the atmospheric cooling after a volcanic eruption, when volcanic ash reflects sunlight. Thermal expansion of ocean water after atmospheric warming is slow, and can take thousands of years. A combination is also possible, e.g., sudden loss of albedo in the Arctic Ocean as sea ice melts, followed by more gradual thermal expansion of the water.

Climate variability can also occur due to internal processes. Internal unforced processes often involve changes in the distribution of energy in the ocean and atmosphere, for instance, changes in the thermohaline circulation.

=== Internal variability ===
There is seasonal variability in how new high temperature records have outpaced new low temperature records.

There is measurable variability in the pattern of global warming, when viewing annual changes in the same month from year to year.

Global warming displays seasonality, with global temperatures rising more during Northern hemisphere summers, due in part to the North's greater portion of land mass.

Climatic changes due to internal variability sometimes occur in cycles or oscillations. For other types of natural climatic change, we cannot predict when it happens; the change is called random or stochastic. From a climate perspective, the weather can be considered random. If there are little clouds in a particular year, there is an energy imbalance and extra heat can be absorbed by the oceans. Due to climate inertia, this signal can be 'stored' in the ocean and be expressed as variability on longer time scales than the original weather disturbances. If the weather disturbances are completely random, occurring as white noise, the inertia of glaciers or oceans can transform this into climate changes where longer-duration oscillations are also larger oscillations, a phenomenon called red noise. Many climate changes have a random aspect and a cyclical aspect. This behavior is dubbed stochastic resonance. Half of the 2021 Nobel prize on physics was awarded for this work to Klaus Hasselmann jointly with Syukuro Manabe for related work on climate modelling. While Giorgio Parisi who with collaborators introduced the concept of stochastic resonance was awarded the other half but mainly for work on theoretical physics.

==== Ocean-atmosphere variability ====
The ocean and atmosphere can work together to spontaneously generate internal climate variability that can persist for years to decades at a time. These variations can affect global average surface temperature by redistributing heat between the deep ocean and the atmosphere and/or by altering the cloud/water vapor/sea ice distribution which can affect the total energy budget of the Earth.

==== Oscillations and cycles ====
Colored bars show how El Niño years (red, regional warming) and La Niña years (blue, regional cooling) relate to overall global warming. The El Niño–Southern Oscillation has been linked to variability in longer-term global average temperature increase, with El Niño years usually corresponding to annual global temperature increases.

A climate oscillation or climate cycle is any recurring cyclical oscillation within global or regional climate. They are quasiperiodic (not perfectly periodic), so a Fourier analysis of the data does not have sharp peaks in the spectrum. Many oscillations on different time-scales have been found or hypothesized:

- the El Niño–Southern Oscillation (ENSO) – A large scale pattern of warmer (El Niño) and colder (La Niña) tropical sea surface temperatures in the Pacific Ocean with worldwide effects. It is a self-sustaining oscillation, whose mechanisms are well-studied. ENSO is the most prominent known source of inter-annual variability in weather and climate around the world. The cycle occurs every two to seven years, with El Niño lasting nine months to two years within the longer term cycle. The cold tongue of the equatorial Pacific Ocean is not warming as fast as the rest of the ocean, due to increased upwelling of cold waters off the west coast of South America.
- the Madden–Julian oscillation (MJO) – An eastward moving pattern of increased rainfall over the tropics with a period of 30 to 60 days, observed mainly over the Indian and Pacific Oceans.
- the North Atlantic oscillation (NAO) – Indices of the NAO are based on the difference of normalized sea-level pressure (SLP) between Ponta Delgada, Azores and Stykkishólmur/Reykjavík, Iceland. Positive values of the index indicate stronger-than-average westerlies over the middle latitudes.
- the Quasi-biennial oscillation – a well-understood oscillation in wind patterns in the stratosphere around the equator. Over a period of 28 months the dominant wind changes from easterly to westerly and back.
- Pacific Centennial Oscillation - a climate oscillation predicted by some climate models
- the Pacific decadal oscillation – The dominant pattern of sea surface variability in the North Pacific on a decadal scale. During a "warm", or "positive", phase, the west Pacific becomes cool and part of the eastern ocean warms; during a "cool" or "negative" phase, the opposite pattern occurs. It is thought not as a single phenomenon, but instead a combination of different physical processes.
- the Interdecadal Pacific oscillation (IPO) – Basin wide variability in the Pacific Ocean with a period between 20 and 30 years.
- the Atlantic multidecadal oscillation – A pattern of variability in the North Atlantic of about 55 to 70 years, with effects on rainfall, droughts and hurricane frequency and intensity.
- North African climate cycles – climate variation driven by the North African Monsoon, with a period of tens of thousands of years.
- the Arctic oscillation (AO) and Antarctic oscillation (AAO) – The annular modes are naturally occurring, hemispheric-wide patterns of climate variability. On timescales of weeks to months they explain 20–30% of the variability in their respective hemispheres. The Northern Annular Mode or Arctic oscillation (AO) in the Northern Hemisphere, and the Southern Annular Mode or Antarctic oscillation (AAO) in the southern hemisphere. The annular modes have a strong influence on the temperature and precipitation of mid-to-high latitude land masses, such as Europe and Australia, by altering the average paths of storms. The NAO can be considered a regional index of the AO/NAM. They are defined as the first EOF of sea level pressure or geopotential height from 20°N to 90°N (NAM) or 20°S to 90°S (SAM).
- Dansgaard–Oeschger cycles – occurring on roughly 1,500-year cycles during the Last Glacial Maximum

==== Ocean current changes ====
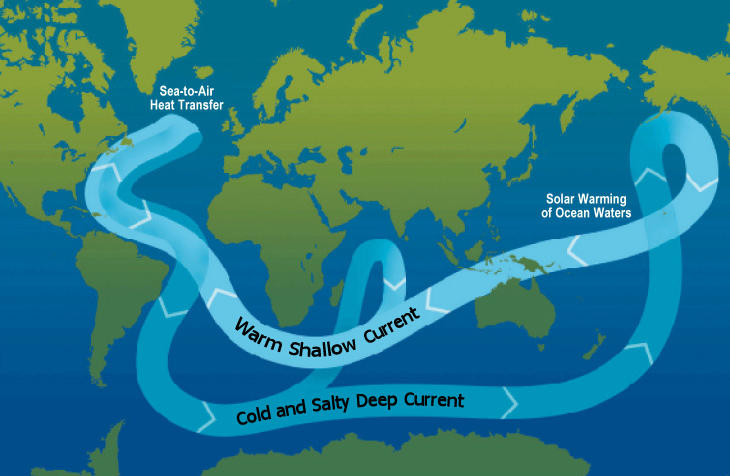
A schematic of modern thermohaline circulation. Tens of millions of years ago, continental-plate movement formed a land-free gap around Antarctica, allowing the formation of the ACC, which keeps warm waters away from Antarctica.

The oceanic aspects of climate variability can generate variability on centennial timescales due to the ocean having hundreds of times more mass than in the atmosphere, and thus very high thermal inertia. For example, alterations to ocean processes such as thermohaline circulation play a key role in redistributing heat in the world's oceans.

Ocean currents transport a lot of energy from the warm tropical regions to the colder polar regions. Changes occurring around the last ice age (in technical terms, the last glacial period) show that the circulation in the North Atlantic can change suddenly and substantially, leading to global climate changes, even though the total amount of energy coming into the climate system did not change much. These large changes may have come from so called Heinrich events where internal instability of ice sheets caused huge ice bergs to be released into the ocean. When the ice sheet melts, the resulting water is very low in salt and cold, driving changes in circulation.

==== Life ====
Life affects climate through its role in the carbon and water cycles and through such mechanisms as albedo, evapotranspiration, cloud formation, and weathering. Examples of how life may have affected past climate include:

- glaciation 2.3 billion years ago triggered by the evolution of oxygenic photosynthesis, which depleted the atmosphere of the greenhouse gas carbon dioxide and introduced free oxygen
- another glaciation 300 million years ago ushered in by long-term burial of decomposition-resistant detritus of vascular land-plants (creating a carbon sink and forming coal)
- termination of the Paleocene–Eocene Thermal Maximum 55 million years ago by flourishing marine phytoplankton
- reversal of global warming 49 million years ago by 800,000 years of arctic azolla blooms
- global cooling over the past 40 million years driven by the expansion of grass-grazer ecosystems

=== External climate forcing ===
==== Greenhouse gases ====
CO_{2} concentrations over the last 800,000 years as measured from ice cores (blue/green) and directly (black)

Whereas greenhouse gases released by the biosphere is often seen as a feedback or internal climate process, greenhouse gases emitted from volcanoes are typically classified as external by climatologists. Greenhouse gases, such as CO_{2}, methane and nitrous oxide, heat the climate system by trapping infrared light. Volcanoes are also part of the extended carbon cycle. Over very long (geological) time periods, they release carbon dioxide from the Earth's crust and mantle, counteracting the uptake by sedimentary rocks and other geological carbon dioxide sinks.

Since the Industrial Revolution, humanity has been adding to greenhouse gases by emitting CO_{2} from fossil fuel combustion, changing land use through deforestation, and has further altered the climate with aerosols (particulate matter in the atmosphere), release of trace gases (e.g. nitrogen oxides, carbon monoxide, or methane). Other factors, including land use, ozone depletion, animal husbandry (ruminant animals such as cattle produce methane), and deforestation, also play a role.

The US Geological Survey estimates are that volcanic emissions are at a much lower level than the effects of current human activities, which generate 100–300 times the amount of carbon dioxide emitted by volcanoes. The annual amount put out by human activities may be greater than the amount released by supereruptions, the most recent of which was the Toba eruption in Indonesia 74,000 years ago.

==== Orbital variations ====
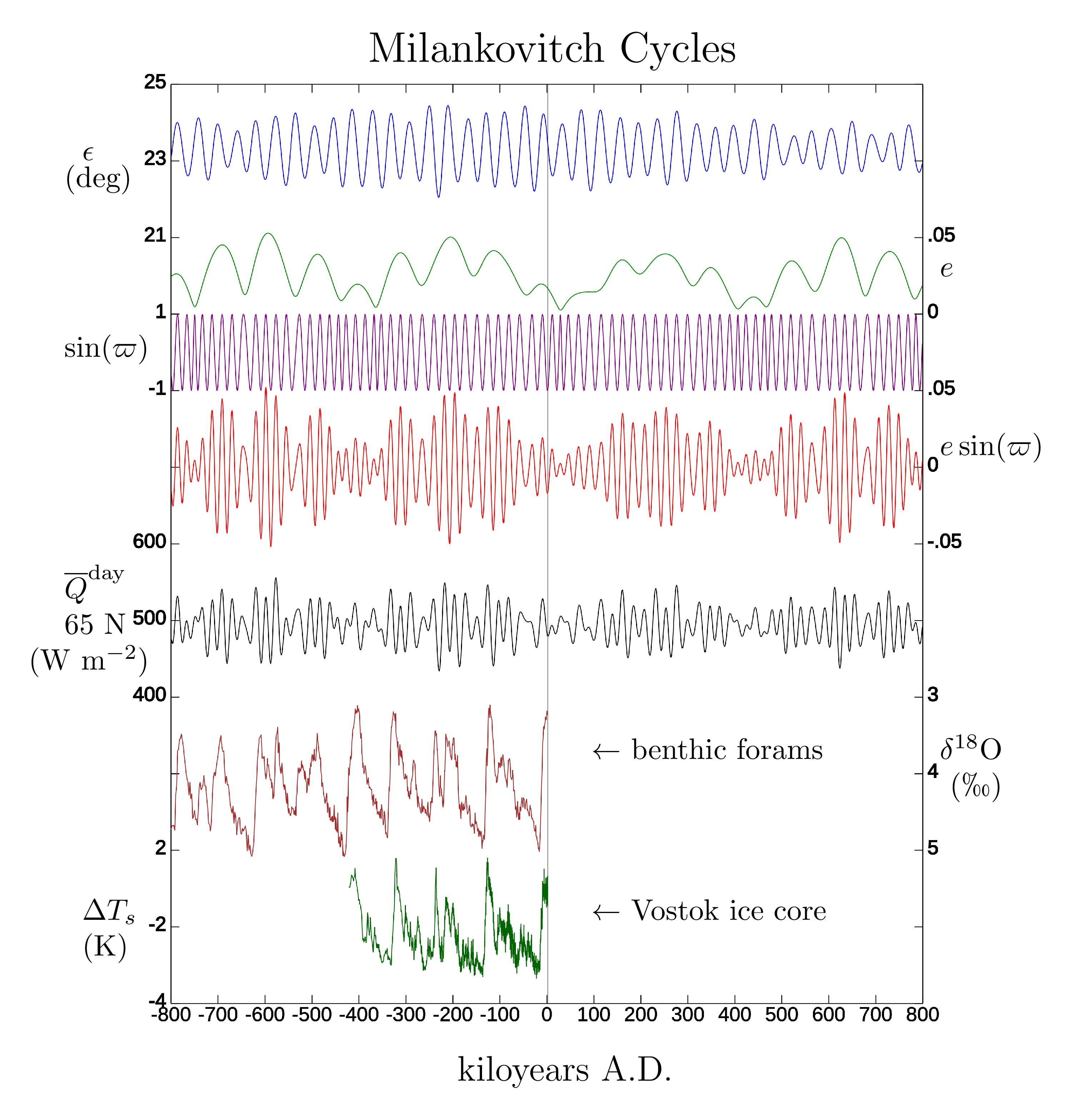
Milankovitch cycles from 800,000 years ago in the past to 800,000 years in the future.

Slight variations in Earth's motion lead to changes in the seasonal distribution of sunlight reaching the Earth's surface and how it is distributed across the globe. There is very little change to the area-averaged annually averaged sunshine; but there can be strong changes in the geographical and seasonal distribution. The three types of kinematic change are variations in Earth's eccentricity, changes in the tilt angle of Earth's axis of rotation, and precession of Earth's axis. Combined, these produce Milankovitch cycles which affect climate and are notable for their correlation to glacial and interglacial periods, their correlation with the advance and retreat of the Sahara, and for their appearance in the stratigraphic record.

During the glacial cycles, there was a high correlation between CO_{2} concentrations and temperatures. Early studies indicated that CO_{2} concentrations lagged temperatures, but it has become clear that this is not always the case. When ocean temperatures increase, the solubility of CO_{2} decreases so that it is released from the ocean. The exchange of CO_{2} between the air and the ocean can also be impacted by further aspects of climatic change. These and other self-reinforcing processes allow small changes in Earth's motion to have a large effect on climate.

==== Solar output ====
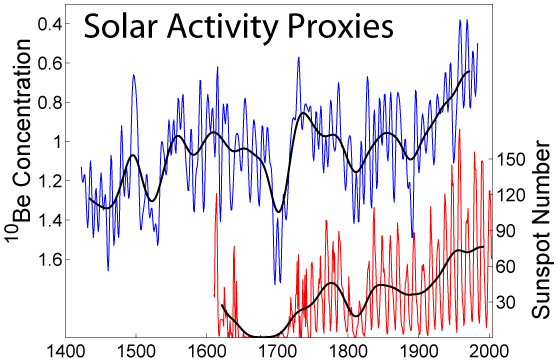
Variations in solar activity during the last several centuries based on observations of sunspots and beryllium isotopes. The period of extraordinarily few sunspots in the late 17th century was the Maunder minimum.

The Sun is the predominant source of energy input to the Earth's climate system. Other sources include geothermal energy from the Earth's core, tidal energy from the Moon and heat from the decay of radioactive compounds. Both long term variations in solar intensity are known to affect global climate. Solar output varies on shorter time scales, including the 11-year solar cycle and longer-term modulations. Correlation between sunspots and climate and tenuous at best.

Three to four billion years ago, the Sun emitted only 75% as much power as it does today. If the atmospheric composition had been the same as today, liquid water should not have existed on the Earth's surface. However, there is evidence for the presence of water on the early Earth, in the Hadean and Archean eons, leading to what is known as the faint young Sun paradox. Hypothesized solutions to this paradox include a vastly different atmosphere, with much higher concentrations of greenhouse gases than currently exist. Over the following approximately 4 billion years, the energy output of the Sun increased. Over the next five billion years, the Sun's ultimate death as it becomes a red giant and then a white dwarf will have large effects on climate, with the red giant phase possibly ending any life on Earth that survives until that time.

==== Volcanism ====
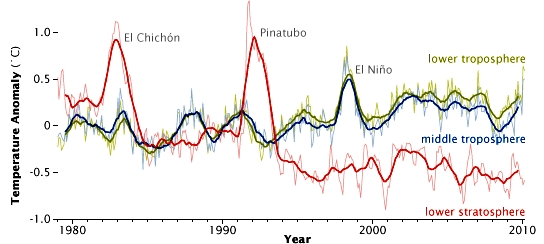
In atmospheric temperature from 1979 to 2010, determined by MSU NASA satellites, effects appear from aerosols released by major volcanic eruptions (El Chichón and Pinatubo). El Niño is a separate event, from ocean variability.

The volcanic eruptions considered to be large enough to affect the Earth's climate on a scale of more than 1 year are the ones that inject over 100,000 tons of SO_{2} into the stratosphere. This is due to the optical properties of SO_{2} and sulfate aerosols, which strongly absorb or scatter solar radiation, creating a global layer of sulfuric acid haze. On average, such eruptions occur several times per century, and cause cooling (by partially blocking the transmission of solar radiation to the Earth's surface) for a period of several years. Although volcanoes are technically part of the lithosphere, which itself is part of the climate system, the IPCC explicitly defines volcanism as an external forcing agent.

Notable eruptions in the historical records are the 1991 eruption of Mount Pinatubo which lowered global temperatures by about 0.5 °C (0.9 °F) for up to three years, and the 1815 eruption of Mount Tambora causing the Year Without a Summer.

At a larger scale—a few times every 50 million to 100 million years—the eruption of large igneous provinces brings large quantities of igneous rock from the mantle and lithosphere to the Earth's surface. Carbon dioxide in the rock is then released into the atmosphere. Small eruptions, with injections of less than 0.1 Mt of sulfur dioxide into the stratosphere, affect the atmosphere only subtly, as temperature changes are comparable with natural variability. However, because smaller eruptions occur at a much higher frequency, they too significantly affect Earth's atmosphere.

==== Plate tectonics ====
Over the course of millions of years, the motion of tectonic plates reconfigures global land and ocean areas and generates topography. This can affect both global and local patterns of climate and atmosphere-ocean circulation.

The position of the continents determines the geometry of the oceans and therefore influences patterns of ocean circulation. The locations of the seas are important in controlling the transfer of heat and moisture across the globe, and therefore, in determining global climate. A recent example of tectonic control on ocean circulation is the formation of the Isthmus of Panama about 5 million years ago, which shut off direct mixing between the Atlantic and Pacific Oceans. This strongly affected the ocean dynamics of what is now the Gulf Stream and may have led to Northern Hemisphere ice cover. During the Carboniferous period, about 300 to 360 million years ago, plate tectonics may have triggered large-scale storage of carbon and increased glaciation. Geologic evidence points to a "megamonsoonal" circulation pattern during the time of the supercontinent Pangaea, and climate modeling suggests that the existence of the supercontinent was conducive to the establishment of monsoons.

The size of continents is also important. Because of the stabilizing effect of the oceans on temperature, yearly temperature variations are generally lower in coastal areas than they are inland. A larger supercontinent will therefore have more area in which climate is strongly seasonal than will several smaller continents or islands.

==== Other mechanisms ====
It has been postulated that ionized particles known as cosmic rays could impact cloud cover and thereby the climate. As the sun shields the Earth from these particles, changes in solar activity were hypothesized to influence climate indirectly as well. To test the hypothesis, CERN designed the CLOUD experiment, which showed the effect of cosmic rays is too weak to influence climate noticeably.

Evidence exists that the Chicxulub asteroid impact some 66 million years ago had severely affected the Earth's climate. Large quantities of sulfate aerosols were kicked up into the atmosphere, decreasing global temperatures by up to 26 °C and producing sub-freezing temperatures for a period of 3–16 years. The recovery time for this event took more than 30 years. The large-scale use of nuclear weapons has also been investigated for its impact on the climate. The hypothesis is that soot released by large-scale fires blocks a significant fraction of sunlight for as much as a year, leading to a sharp drop in temperatures for a few years. This possible event is described as nuclear winter.

Humans' use of land impact how much sunlight the surface reflects and the concentration of dust. Cloud formation is not only influenced by how much water is in the air and the temperature, but also by the amount of aerosols in the air such as dust. Globally, more dust is available if there are many regions with dry soils, little vegetation and strong winds.

== Evidence and measurement of climate changes ==
Paleoclimatology is the study of changes in climate through the entire history of Earth. It uses a variety of proxy methods from the Earth and life sciences to obtain data preserved within things such as rocks, sediments, ice sheets, tree rings, corals, shells, and microfossils. It then uses the records to determine the past states of the Earth's various climate regions and its atmospheric system. Direct measurements give a more complete overview of climate variability.

=== Direct measurements ===
Climate changes that occurred after the widespread deployment of measuring devices can be observed directly. Reasonably complete global records of surface temperature are available beginning from the mid-late 19th century. Further observations are derived indirectly from historical documents. Satellite cloud and precipitation data has been available since the 1970s.

Historical climatology is the study of historical changes in climate and their effect on human history and development. The primary sources include written records such as sagas, chronicles, maps and local history literature as well as pictorial representations such as paintings, drawings and even rock art. Climate variability in the recent past may be derived from changes in settlement and agricultural patterns. Archaeological evidence, oral history and historical documents can offer insights into past changes in the climate. Changes in climate have been linked to the rise and the collapse of various civilizations.

=== Proxy measurements ===
Variations in CO_{2}, temperature and dust from the Vostok ice core over the last 450,000 years.

Various archives of past climate are present in rocks, trees and fossils. From these archives, indirect measures of climate, so-called proxies, can be derived. Quantification of climatological variation of precipitation in prior centuries and epochs is less complete but approximated using proxies such as marine sediments, ice cores, cave stalagmites, and tree rings. Stress, too little precipitation or unsuitable temperatures, can alter the growth rate of trees, which allows scientists to infer climate trends by analyzing the growth rate of tree rings. This branch of science studying this called dendroclimatology. Glaciers leave behind moraines that contain a wealth of material—including organic matter, quartz, and potassium that may be dated—recording the periods in which a glacier advanced and retreated.

Analysis of ice in cores drilled from an ice sheet such as the Antarctic ice sheet, can be used to show a link between temperature and global sea level variations. The air trapped in bubbles in the ice can also reveal the CO_{2} variations of the atmosphere from the distant past, well before modern environmental influences. The study of these ice cores has been a significant indicator of the changes in CO_{2} over many millennia, and continues to provide valuable information about the differences between ancient and modern atmospheric conditions. The ^{18}O/^{16}O ratio in calcite and ice core samples used to deduce ocean temperature in the distant past is an example of a temperature proxy method.

The remnants of plants, and specifically pollen, are also used to study climatic change. Plant distributions vary under different climate conditions. Different groups of plants have pollen with distinctive shapes and surface textures, and since the outer surface of pollen is composed of a very resilient material, they resist decay. Changes in the type of pollen found in different layers of sediment indicate changes in plant communities. These changes are often a sign of a changing climate. As an example, pollen studies have been used to track changing vegetation patterns throughout the Quaternary glaciations and especially since the last glacial maximum. Remains of beetles are common in freshwater and land sediments. Different species of beetles tend to be found under different climatic conditions. Given the extensive lineage of beetles whose genetic makeup has not altered significantly over the millennia, knowledge of the present climatic range of the different species, and the age of the sediments in which remains are found, past climatic conditions may be inferred.

=== Analysis and uncertainties ===
One difficulty in detecting climate cycles is that the Earth's climate has been changing in non-cyclic ways over most paleoclimatological timescales. Currently we are in a period of anthropogenic global warming. In a larger timeframe, the Earth is emerging from the latest ice age, cooling from the Holocene climatic optimum and warming from the "Little Ice Age", which means that climate has been constantly changing over the last 15,000 years or so. During warm periods, temperature fluctuations are often of a lesser amplitude. The Pleistocene period, dominated by repeated glaciations, developed out of more stable conditions in the Miocene and Pliocene climate. Holocene climate has been relatively stable. All of these changes complicate the task of looking for cyclical behavior in the climate.

Positive feedback, negative feedback, and ecological inertia from the land-ocean-atmosphere system often attenuate or reverse smaller effects, whether from orbital forcings, solar variations or changes in concentrations of greenhouse gases. Certain feedbacks involving processes such as clouds are also uncertain; for contrails, natural cirrus clouds, oceanic dimethyl sulfide and a land-based equivalent, competing theories exist concerning effects on climatic temperatures, for example contrasting the Iris hypothesis and CLAW hypothesis.

== Impacts ==
=== Life ===
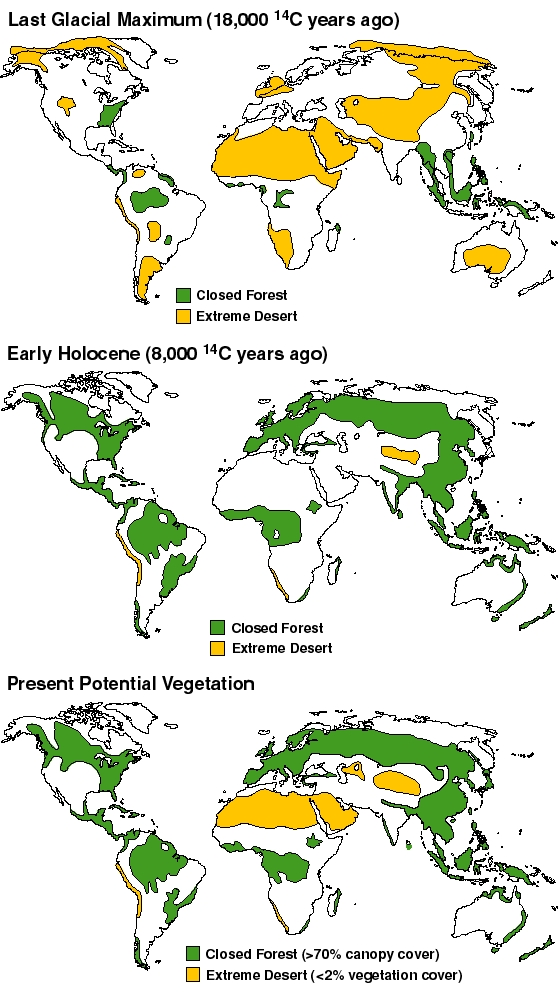
Top: Arid ice age climate Middle: Atlantic Period, warm and wet Bottom: Potential vegetation in climate now if not for human effects like agriculture.

==== Vegetation ====
A change in the type, distribution and coverage of vegetation may occur given a change in the climate. Some changes in climate may result in increased precipitation and warmth, resulting in improved plant growth and the subsequent sequestration of airborne CO_{2}. Though an increase in CO_{2} may benefit plants, some factors can diminish this increase. If there is an environmental change such as drought, increased CO_{2} concentrations will not benefit the plant. So even though climate change does increase CO_{2} emissions, plants will often not use this increase as other environmental stresses put pressure on them. However, sequestration of CO_{2} is expected to affect the rate of many natural cycles like plant litter decomposition rates. A gradual increase in warmth in a region will lead to earlier flowering and fruiting times, driving a change in the timing of life cycles of dependent organisms. Conversely, cold will cause plant bio-cycles to lag.

Larger, faster or more radical changes, however, may result in vegetation stress, rapid plant loss and desertification in certain circumstances. An example of this occurred during the Carboniferous Rainforest Collapse (CRC), an extinction event 300 million years ago. At this time vast rainforests covered the equatorial region of Europe and America. Climate change devastated these tropical rainforests, abruptly fragmenting the habitat into isolated 'islands' and causing the extinction of many plant and animal species.

==== Wildlife ====
One of the most important ways animals can deal with climatic change is migration to warmer or colder regions. On a longer timescale, evolution makes ecosystems including animals better adapted to a new climate. Rapid or large climate change can cause mass extinctions when creatures are stretched too far to be able to adapt.

==== Humanity ====
Collapses of past civilizations such as the Maya may be related to cycles of precipitation, especially drought, that in this example also correlates to the Western Hemisphere Warm Pool. Around 70 000 years ago the Toba supervolcano eruption created an especially cold period during the ice age, leading to a possible genetic bottleneck in human populations.

=== Changes in the cryosphere ===
==== Glaciers and ice sheets ====
Glaciers are considered among the most sensitive indicators of a changing climate. Their size is determined by a mass balance between snow input and melt output. As temperatures increase, glaciers retreat unless snow precipitation increases to make up for the additional melt. Glaciers grow and shrink due both to natural variability and external forcings. Variability in temperature, precipitation and hydrology can strongly determine the evolution of a glacier in a particular season.

The most significant climate processes since the middle to late Pliocene (approximately 3 million years ago) are the glacial and interglacial cycles. The present interglacial period (the Holocene) has lasted about 11,700 years. Shaped by orbital variations, responses such as the rise and fall of continental ice sheets and significant sea-level changes helped create the climate. Other changes, including Heinrich events, Dansgaard–Oeschger events and the Younger Dryas, however, illustrate how glacial variations may also influence climate without the orbital forcing.

==== Sea level change ====
During the Last Glacial Maximum, some 25,000 years ago, sea levels were roughly 130 m lower than today. The deglaciation afterwards was characterized by rapid sea level change. In the early Pliocene, global temperatures were 1–2˚C warmer than the present temperature, yet sea level was 15–25 meters higher than today.

==== Sea ice ====
Sea ice plays an important role in Earth's climate as it affects the total amount of sunlight that is reflected away from the Earth. In the past, the Earth's oceans have been almost entirely covered by sea ice on a number of occasions, when the Earth was in a so-called Snowball Earth state, and completely ice-free in periods of warm climate. When there is a lot of sea ice present globally, especially in the tropics and subtropics, the climate is more sensitive to forcings as the ice–albedo feedback is very strong.

== Climate history ==
Various climate forcings are typically in flux throughout geologic time, and some processes of the Earth's temperature may be self-regulating. For example, during the Snowball Earth period, large glacial ice sheets spanned to Earth's equator, covering nearly its entire surface, and very high albedo created extremely low temperatures, while the accumulation of snow and ice likely removed carbon dioxide through atmospheric deposition. However, the absence of plant cover to absorb atmospheric CO_{2} emitted by volcanoes meant that the greenhouse gas could accumulate in the atmosphere. There was also an absence of exposed silicate rocks, which use CO_{2} when they undergo weathering. This created a warming that later melted the ice and brought Earth's temperature back up.

=== Paleo-eocene thermal maximum ===
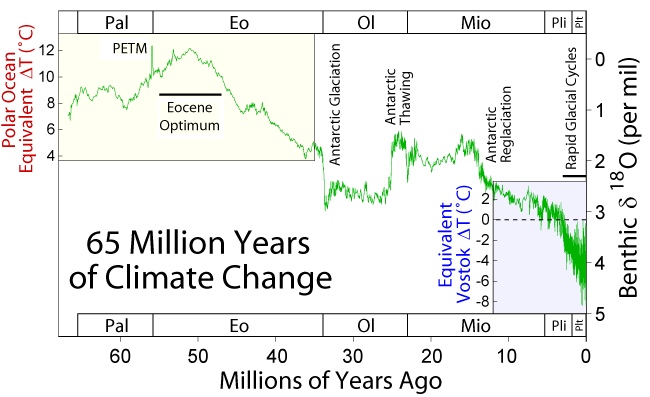
Climate changes over the past 65 million years, using proxy data including Oxygen-18 ratios from foraminifera.

The Paleocene–Eocene Thermal Maximum (PETM) was a time period with more than 5–8 °C global average temperature rise across the event. This climate event occurred at the time boundary of the Paleocene and Eocene geological epochs. During the event large amounts of methane was released, a potent greenhouse gas. The PETM represents a "case study" for modern climate change as in the greenhouse gases were released in a geologically relatively short amount of time. During the PETM, a mass extinction of organisms in the deep ocean took place.

=== The Cenozoic ===
Throughout the Cenozoic, multiple climate forcings led to warming and cooling of the atmosphere, which led to the early formation of the Antarctic ice sheet, subsequent melting, and its later reglaciation. The temperature changes occurred somewhat suddenly, at carbon dioxide concentrations of about 600–760 ppm and temperatures approximately 4 °C warmer than today. During the Pleistocene, cycles of glaciations and interglacials occurred on cycles of roughly 100,000 years, but may stay longer within an interglacial when orbital eccentricity approaches zero, as during the current interglacial. Previous interglacials such as the Eemian phase created temperatures higher than today, higher sea levels, and some partial melting of the West Antarctic ice sheet.

Climatological temperatures substantially affect cloud cover and precipitation. At lower temperatures, air can hold less water vapour, which can lead to decreased precipitation. During the Last Glacial Maximum of 18,000 years ago, thermal-driven evaporation from the oceans onto continental landmasses was low, causing large areas of extreme desert, including polar deserts (cold but with low rates of cloud cover and precipitation). In contrast, the world's climate was cloudier and wetter than today near the start of the warm Atlantic Period of 8000 years ago.

==== The Holocene ====
Temperature change over the past 12 000 years, from various sources. The thick black curve is an average.

The Holocene is characterized by a long-term cooling starting after the Holocene Optimum, when temperatures were probably only just below current temperatures (second decade of the 21st century), and a strong African Monsoon created grassland conditions in the Sahara during the Neolithic Subpluvial. Since that time, several cooling events have occurred, including:

- the Piora Oscillation
- the Middle Bronze Age Cold Epoch
- the Iron Age Cold Epoch
- the Little Ice Age
- the phase of cooling c. 1940–1970, which led to global cooling hypothesis

In contrast, several warm periods have also taken place, and they include but are not limited to:

- a warm period during the apex of the Minoan civilization
- the Roman Warm Period
- the Medieval Warm Period
- Modern warming during the 20th century

Certain effects have occurred during these cycles. For example, during the Medieval Warm Period, the American Midwest was in drought, including the Sand Hills of Nebraska which were active sand dunes. The black death plague of Yersinia pestis also occurred during Medieval temperature fluctuations, and may be related to changing climates.

Solar activity may have contributed to part of the modern warming that peaked in the 1930s. However, solar cycles fail to account for warming observed since the 1980s to the present day. Events such as the opening of the Northwest Passage and recent record low ice minima of the modern Arctic shrinkage have not taken place for at least several centuries, as early explorers were all unable to make an Arctic crossing, even in summer. Shifts in biomes and habitat ranges are also unprecedented, occurring at rates that do not coincide with known climate oscillations.

=== Modern climate change and global warming ===
As a consequence of humans emitting greenhouse gases, global surface temperatures have started rising. Global warming is an aspect of modern climate change, a term that also includes the observed changes in precipitation, storm tracks and cloudiness. As a consequence, glaciers worldwide have been found to be shrinking significantly. Land ice sheets in both Antarctica and Greenland have been losing mass since 2002 and have seen an acceleration of ice mass loss since 2009. Global sea levels have been rising as a consequence of thermal expansion and ice melt. The decline in Arctic sea ice, both in extent and thickness, over the last several decades is further evidence for rapid climate change.

==== Variability among regions and across seasons ====
Land-ocean. Surface air temperatures over land masses have been increasing faster than those over the ocean, the ocean absorbing about 90% of excess heat.

Hemispheres. The Hemispheres' average temperature changes have diverged because of the North's greater percentage of landmass, and due to global ocean currents.

Latitude bands. Three latitude bands that respectively cover 30, 40 and 30 percent of the global surface area show mutually distinct temperature growth patterns in recent decades.

Latitude bands. Global warming has varied substantially by latitude, with the northernmost latitude zones experiencing the largest temperature increases.

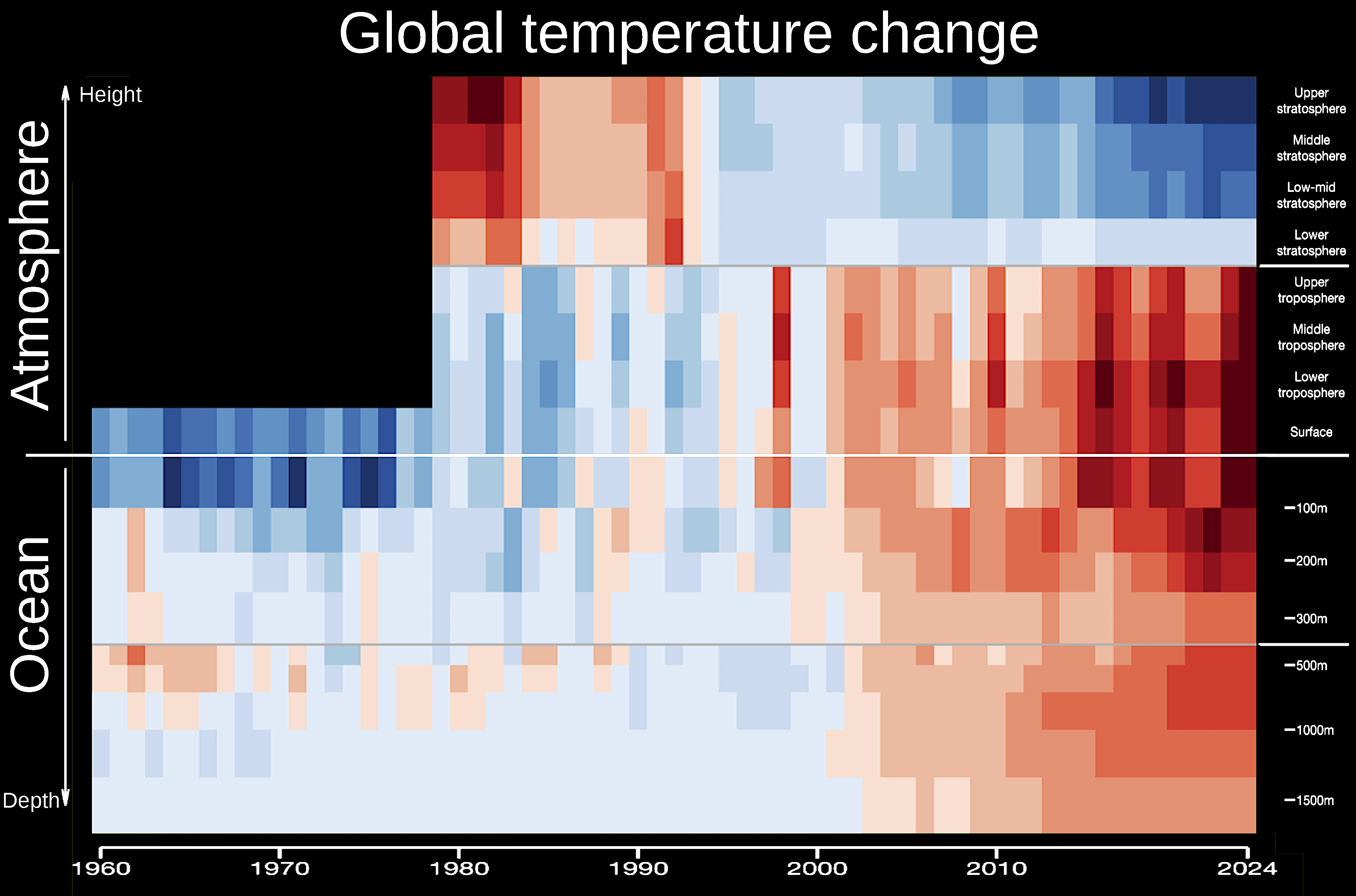
Altitude. A warming stripes graphic (blues denote cool, reds denote warm) shows how the greenhouse effect traps heat in the lower atmosphere and oceans, so that the upper atmosphere, receiving less reflected energy, cools.

Global versus regional. For geographical and statistical reasons, larger year-to-year variations are expected for localized geographic regions (e.g., the Caribbean) than for global averages.

Relative deviation. Though northern America has warmed more than its tropics, the tropics have more clearly departed from normal historical variability (colored bands: 1σ, 2σ standard deviations).

Across seasons. Effects of climate change on sea ice vary with the seasons. Rates of ice loss, in the same month over years since 1979, are more than twice as great in September as in May.

In addition to global climate variability and global climate change over time, numerous climatic variations occur contemporaneously across different physical regions.

The oceans' absorption of about 90% of excess heat has helped to cause land surface temperatures to grow more rapidly than sea surface temperatures. The Northern Hemisphere, having a larger landmass-to-ocean ratio than the Southern Hemisphere, shows greater average temperature increases. Variations across different latitude bands also reflect this divergence in average temperature increase, with the temperature increase of northern extratropics exceeding that of the tropics, which in turn exceeds that of the southern extratropics.

Upper regions of the atmosphere have been cooling contemporaneously with a warming in the lower atmosphere, confirming the action of the greenhouse effect and ozone depletion.

Observed regional climatic variations confirm predictions concerning ongoing changes, for example, by contrasting (smoother) year-to-year global variations with (more volatile) year-to-year variations in localized regions. Conversely, comparing different regions' warming patterns to their respective historical variabilities, allows the raw magnitudes of temperature changes to be placed in the perspective of what is normal variability for each region.

Regional variability observations permit study of regionalized climate tipping points such as rainforest loss, ice sheet and sea ice melt, and permafrost thawing. Such distinctions underlie research into a possible global cascade of tipping points.

== See also ==
- Climatological normal
- Anthropocene
- Ocean heat content
- Economics of climate and weather-related investments
