= Roman Warm Period =

Warm weather period, 250 BC to AD 400

The Roman Warm Period, or Roman Climatic Optimum, was a period of unusually-warm weather in Europe and the North Atlantic that ran from approximately 250 BC to AD 400. Theophrastus (371 – c. 287 BC) wrote that date trees could grow in Greece if they were planted but that they could not set fruit there. That is still the case today, which implies that South Aegean mean summer temperatures in the 4th and the 5th centuries BC were within a degree of modern ones. That and other literary fragments from the time confirm that the Greek climate was basically the same then as around 2000. Tree rings from the Italian Peninsula in the late 3rd century BC indicate a time of mild conditions there around the time of Hannibal's crossing of the Alps with imported elephants in 218 BC.

Dendrochronological evidence from wood found at the Parthenon shows variability of climate in the 5th century BC, which resembles the modern pattern of variation.

Cooling at the end of the period is noted in Southwest Florida, which may have been caused by a reduction in solar radiation reaching the Earth. That may have triggered a change in atmospheric circulation patterns.

The phrase "Roman Warm Period" first appears in a 1995 doctoral thesis. It was popularized by an article published in Nature in 1999.

More recent research, including a 2019 analysis based on a much larger dataset of climate proxies, has found that the putative period, along with other warmer or colder pre-industrial periods such as the "Little Ice Age" and "Medieval Warm Period," were regional phenomena, not globally-coherent episodes. That analysis uses the temperature record of the last 2,000 years dataset compiled by the PAGES 2k Consortium 2017.

== Proxies ==
=== Pollen ===
A high-resolution pollen analysis of a core from Galicia concluded in 2003 that the Roman Warm Period lasted from 250 BC to AD 450 in northwestern Iberia.

=== Glaciers ===
A 1986 analysis of Alpine glaciers concluded that the period from AD 100 to 400 was significantly warmer than earlier and later centuries. Artifacts recovered from the retreating Schnidejoch glacier have been taken as evidence for the Bronze Age, Roman, and Medieval Warm Periods.

=== Deep ocean sediment ===
A 1999 reconstruction of ocean current patterns, based on the granularity of deep ocean sediment, concluded that there was a Roman Warm Period, which peaked around AD 100.

=== Mollusk shells ===
An analysis of oxygen isotopes found in mollusk shells in an Icelandic inlet concluded in 2010 that Iceland experienced a warm period from 230 BC to AD 140.

== See also ==
- Climate of ancient Rome

== General and cited references ==
- Moberg, Anders; Sonechkin, Dmitry M.; Holmgren, Karin; Datsenko, Nina M.; Karlén, Wibjörn; Lauritzen, S. E. (10 February 2005), "Highly variable Northern Hemisphere temperatures reconstructed from low- and high-resolution proxy data", Nature, 433 (7026): 613–617, Bibcode:2005Natur.433..613M, doi:10.1038/nature03265, PMID 15703742, S2CID 4359264. Corrigendum: Moberg et al. 2006.
- Moberg, Anders; Sonechkin, Dimitry M.; Holmgren, Karin; Datsenko, Nina M.; Karlén, Wibjörn; Lauritzen, Stein-Erik (23 February 2006), "Corrigendum: Highly variable Northern Hemisphere temperatures reconstructed from low- and high-resolution proxy data", Nature, 439 (7079): 1014, Bibcode:2006Natur.439.1014M, doi:10.1038/nature04575.
- Jansen E, Overpeck J, et al. (2007), "Palaeoclimate", in Solomon S, Qin D, Manning M, Chen Z, Marquis M, Averyt KB, Tignor M, Miller ML (eds.), Climate Change 2007: The Physical Science Basis. Contribution of Working Group I to the Fourth Assessment Report of the Intergovernmental Panel on Climate Change, Cambridge, UK and New York, NY, USA: Cambridge University Press, ISBN 978-0-521-88009-1, archived from the original on 16 January 2010. (pb: 978-0-521-70596-7).
- Huang S, Pollack HN, Shen PY (4 July 2008), "A late Quaternary climate reconstruction based on borehole heat flux data, borehole temperature data, and the instrumental record", Geophysical Research Letters, 35 (13), L13703, Bibcode:2008GeoRL..3513703H, doi:10.1029/2008GL034187, hdl:2027.42/95180, S2CID 11399172.
- Mann, Michael E.; Zhang, Zhihua; Hughes, Malcolm K.; Bradley, Raymond S.; Miller, Sonya K.; Rutherford, Scott; Ni, Fenbiao (9 September 2008), "Proxy-based reconstructions of hemispheric and global surface temperature variations over the past two millennia", Proceedings of the National Academy of Sciences of the United States of America, 105 (36): 13252–13257, Bibcode:2008PNAS..10513252M, doi:10.1073/pnas.0805721105, PMC 2527990, PMID 18765811.
- Black, Richard (1 September 2008), "Climate 'hockey stick' is revived", BBC News
- Arctic Warming Overtakes 2,000 Years of Natural Cooling, University Corporation for Atmospheric Research, 3 September 2009, archived from the original on 27 April 2011.
- Bello, David (4 September 2009), "Global Warming Reverses Long-Term Arctic Cooling", Scientific American.
- Kaufman, Darrel; Schneider, David P.; McKay, Nicholas P.; Ammann, Caspar M.; Bradley, Raymond S.; Briffa, Keith R.; Miller, Gifford H.; Otto-Bliesner, Bette L.; Overpeck, Jonathan T.; Vinther, Bo M.; et al. (Arctic Lakes 2k Project) (4 September 2009), "Recent warming reverses long-term arctic cooling", Science, 325 (5945): 1236–1239, Bibcode:2009Sci...325.1236K, doi:10.1126/science.1173983, PMID 19729653, S2CID 23844037.
- Mann, Michael E.; Zhang, Zhihua; Rutherford, Scott; Bradley, Raymond S.; Hughes, Malcolm K.; Shindell, Ddrew; Ammann, Caspar M.; Faluvegi, Greg; Ni, Fenbiao (27 November 2009), "Global Signatures and Dynamical Origins of the Little Ice Age and Medieval Climate Anomaly", Science, 326 (5957): 1256–1260, Bibcode:2009Sci...326.1256M, doi:10.1126/science.1177303, PMID 19965474, S2CID 18655276.
- Ljungqvist, F. C. (September 2010), "A New Reconstruction of Temperature Variability in the Extra-Tropical Northern Hemisphere During the Last Two Millennia" (PDF), Geografiska Annaler: Series A, Physical Geography, 92 (3): 339–351, Bibcode:2010GeAnA..92..339L, doi:10.1111/j.1468-0459.2010.00399.x, S2CID 55018654.
- Ljungqvist, F. C.; Krusic, P. J.; Brattström, G.; Sundqvist, H. S. (2012), "Northern Hemisphere temperature patterns in the last 12 centuries", Climate of the Past, 8 (1): 227–249, Bibcode:2012CliPa...8..227L, doi:10.5194/cp-8-227-2012.
- Sallares, Robert (2007). "Ecology". In Scheidel, Walter; Morris, Ian; Saller, Richard P. (eds.). The Cambridge Economic History of the Greco-Roman World. Cambridge, UK: Cambridge University Press. doi:10.1017/chol9780521780537.003. ISBN 978-0-511-46707-3. OCLC 263074667.
- PAGES 2k Consortium (11 July 2017). "A global multiproxy database for temperature reconstructions of the Common Era - Scientific Data". Scientific Data. 4 (1): 170088. Bibcode:2017NatSD...470088E. doi:10.1038/sdata.2017.88. PMC 5505119. PMID 28696409.
