= South Pacific convergence zone =

Seasonal storm pattern

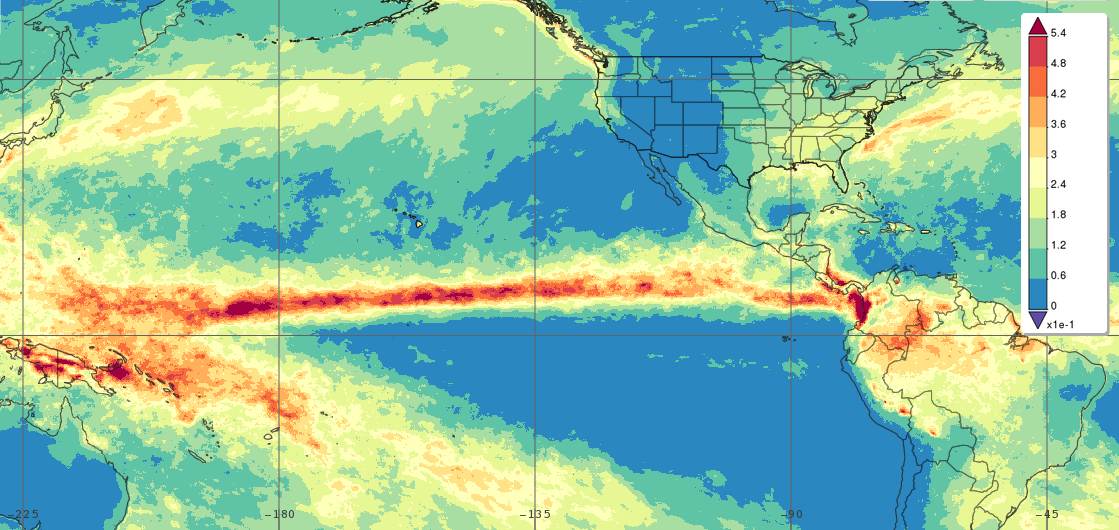
Annual precipitation rates in the SPCZ.

The South Pacific Convergence Zone (SPCZ), a reverse-oriented monsoon trough, is a band of low-level convergence, cloudiness and precipitation extending from the Western Pacific Warm Pool at the maritime continent south-eastwards towards French Polynesia and as far as the Cook Islands (160W, 20S). The SPCZ is a portion of the Intertropical Convergence Zone (ITCZ) which lies in a band extending east–west near the Equator but can be more extratropical in nature, especially east of the International Date Line. It is considered the largest and most important piece of the ITCZ, and has the least dependence upon heating from a nearby landmass during the summer than any other portion of the monsoon trough. The SPCZ can affect the precipitation on Polynesian islands in the southwest Pacific Ocean, so it is important to understand how the SPCZ behaves with large-scale, global climate phenomenon, such as the ITCZ, El Niño–Southern Oscillation, and the Interdecadal Pacific oscillation (IPO), a portion of the Pacific decadal oscillation.

== Position ==
The SPCZ occurs where the southeast trades from transitory anticyclones to the south meet with the semipermanent easterly flow from the eastern South Pacific anticyclone. The SPCZ exists in summer and winter but can change its orientation and location. It is often distinct from the ITCZ over Australia, but at times they become one continuous zone of convergence. The location of the SPCZ is affected by ENSO and Interdecadal Pacific oscillation conditions. It generally stretches from the Solomon Islands through Vanuatu, Fiji, Samoa, and Tonga. Low-level convergence along this band forms cloudiness as well as showers and thunderstorms. Thunderstorm activity, or convection, within the band is dependent upon the season, as the more equatorward portion is most active in the Southern Hemisphere summer, and the more poleward portion is most active during transition seasons of fall and spring. The convergence zone shifts east or west depending on the existence of El Niño, or the phase of ENSO.

=== Measuring SPCZ position ===
The climatological position can be estimated by computing its mean position over 30 or more years. There are several metrics to measure the position of the SPCZ. The location of maximum rainfall, maximum of low level convergence, maxima of the 500 hPa vertical motion, and the minimum in outgoing longwave radiation (OLR) are four indicators of the SPCZ axis. Figure 1 shows qualitative agreement between all of these SPCZ indicators.

== Changes in SPCZ position ==
The position of the SPCZ can change on seasonal, interannual, and possibly longer timescales.

=== Observations ===
Research into SPCZ movements of the 20th century are linked to changes in the IPO and ENSO. Folland et al., 2002 defined an index to describe the Interdecadal Pacific oscillation (IPO) with sea surface temperature and night marine air temperature to determine how the SPCZ varies with the IPO. When the IPO index has negative temperature anomalies, the SPCZ is displaced southwest and moves northeastward when the IPO index has positive temperature anomalies. The Southern Oscillation Index (SOI) is a metric for describing warm- and cold-phase conditions associated with the El Niño–Southern Oscillation (ENSO) and can also describe movements of the position of the SPCZ. Negative SOI index values are associated with warm-phase or El Niño-like conditions and a northeastward displacement of the SPCZ. Positive SOI index values, on the other hand, describe cold-phase or La Niña-like conditions and a southwestward displacement of the SPCZ.

Determining the position of the SPCZ over longer timescales in the past (pre-20th century) has been studied using coral records of the southwest Pacific. Linsley et al. (2006) reconstructed sea-surface temperature and sea surface salinity in the southwest Pacific starting circa 1600CE by measuring the oxygen isotopic composition of four Porites coral records from Rarotonga and two from Fiji. Coral isotope measurements provide information on both sea surface temperature and sea surface salinity, so they can indicate times of increased or decreased temperature and/or precipitation associated with changes in the position of the SPCZ. Their coral oxygen isotope index indicated an eastward shift of the decadal mean position of the SPCZ since the mid 1800s. A shift of the SPCZ in this direction suggests there were more La Niña-like or cold-phase conditions in the Pacific, during this period, often called the Little Ice Age. Additional paleoclimate studies are still needed in order to test the reliability of these coral results.

The IPO and ENSO can interact together to produce changes in the position of the SPCZ. West of about 140 W, both ENSO (measured with Southern Oscillation Index) and IPO strongly influence the SPCZ latitude, but farther east only ENSO is a significant factor. Only near 170 W is there any indication of an interaction between the two factors.

=== Climate modelling ===
Besides observations of the SPCZ and movement in its position, there have been modelling studies as well. Widlansky et al. (2012) used a number of climate models of differing complexity to simulate rainfall bands in the southwest Pacific and see how the magnitude and areal extent was affected by the SPCZ and ENSO. During El Niño or warm-phase conditions, the SPCZ typically shifted northeastward with dryer conditions on islands to the southwest, in agreement with observations. Conversely, a southwestward shift in rainfall accompanied La Niña or cold-phase events in the simulations. Widlanksy et al. (2012) argued the sea surface temperature biases in models created uncertainty in the rainfall projections and produce what has been named “the double ITCZ problem”. The impact of sea surface temperature bias was further investigated by using uncoupled atmospheric models with prescribed sea surface temperatures, and those 3 models each with differing complexity showed less severe double ITCZ bias than the ensemble of coupled models.

== Related oceanography ==
At its southeast edge, the circulation around the feature forces a salinity gradient in the ocean, with fresher and warmer waters of the western Pacific lying to its west. Cooler and saltier waters lie to its east.

== See also ==
- El Niño–Southern Oscillation
- Monsoon trough
- Tropical cyclogenesis
- Tropical cyclone
- Coral bleaching
