= Pacific Centennial Oscillation =

Predicted climate oscillation

Pacific Centennial Oscillation is a climate oscillation predicted by some climate models.

In the Pacific Ocean, variability in sea surface temperatures is an important influence on precipitation regimens in the Americas and how this variability changes in response to anthropogenic climate change (El Nino-like or La Nina-like) may determine the outcome of climate change. The sea surface temperature patterns may fluctuate over thousands or millions of years and determining trends and patterns from observational data is difficult.

Several climate models have shown the existence of a centennial scale cycle in Pacific Ocean temperatures, with fluctuations of about 0.5 °C (0.90 °F) and most temperature changes concentrated below the surface of the Western Pacific. The predicted effects have some similarities to El Nino Southern Oscillation and may be responsible for recent La Nina-like trends in Pacific Ocean temperature patterns and trends in the east–west gradient of Pacific sea surface temperatures from 1900 forward; in one climate model the Pacific Centennial Oscillation drives long droughts in the Southwestern United States such as the 2011–2017 California drought.

The Pacific Centennial Oscillation cycle however might be spurious, a model artifact. Later research has shown the possibility that centennial cycles in the Pacific Ocean sea surface temperature structure can be a consequence of an overly long Pacific cold tongue, although genuine centennial cycles in nature cannot be completely ruled out and has been re-proposed to explain centennial droughts in the Southwestern United States and in connection to a dipole mode between the southeastern Indian and Pacific Oceans.
