= North Pacific Oscillation =

Climatic cycle affecting North America and East Asia

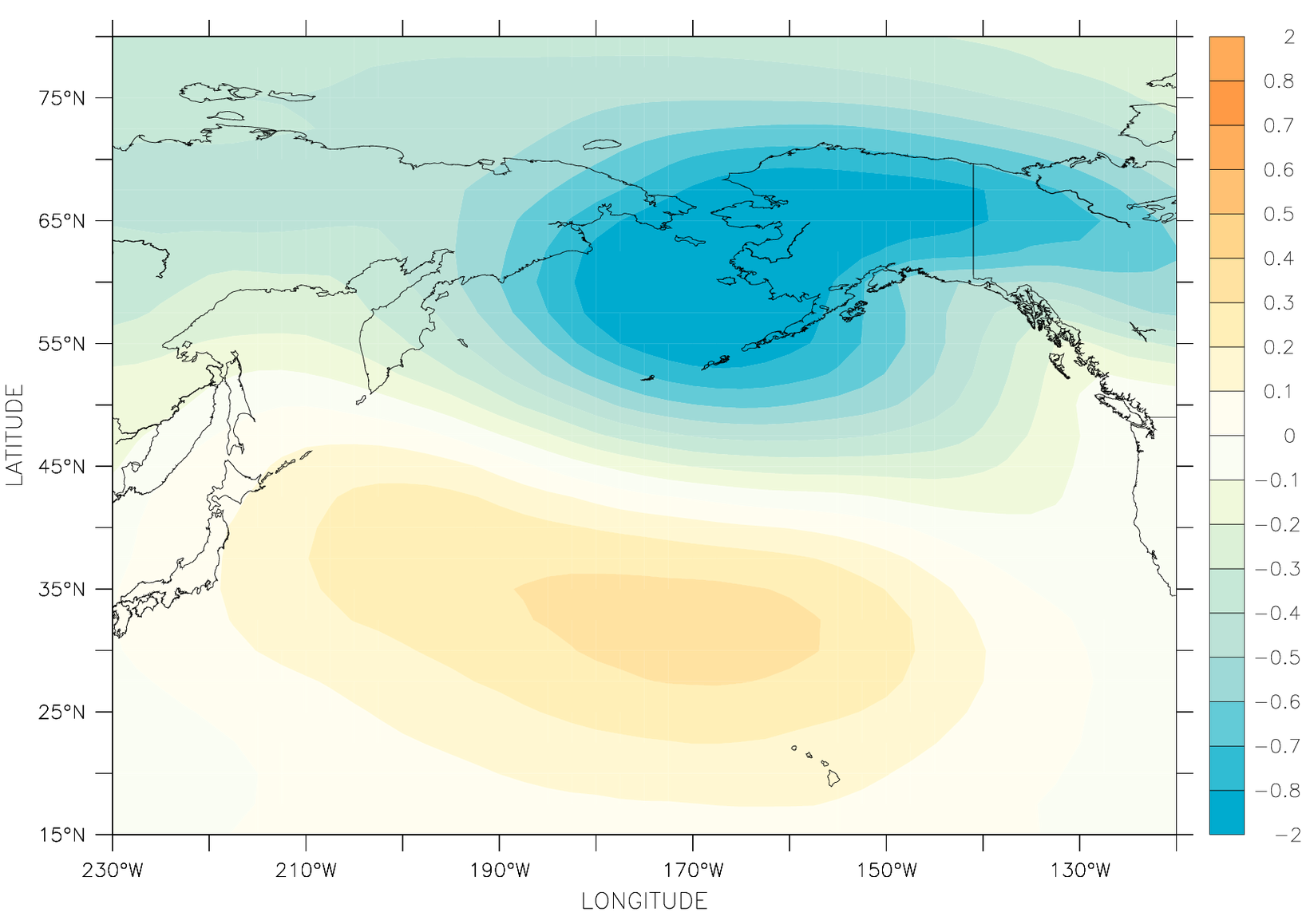
The NPO pattern.

The North Pacific Oscillation (NPO) is a teleconnection pattern first described by Walker and Bliss and characterized by a north–south seesaw in sea-level pressure over the North Pacific Ocean.
Rogers, using surface atmospheric temperature from St. Paul, Alaska, and Edmonton, identified two phases of the NPO, an Aleutian below (AB) phase that corresponds to a deepened and eastward shifted Aleutian Low and an Aleutian above (AA) phase that is the opposite.

During the positive (AB) phase, sea-level pressure is enhanced over a large region in the subtropics that extends poleward to 40N° and reduced at higher latitudes, westerlies are enhanced over the central Pacific and winter temperature is mild along much of the North America west coast but cooler than usual over Eastern Siberia and the United States South-West, precipitations are higher than usual over Alaska and the Great Plains. The effects of the NPO propagate into the subtropics and tropics through another climate mode, the Pacific Meridional Mode.
The North Pacific Gyre Oscillation (NPGO) is the oceanic expression of the NPO.

== See also ==
- Pacific decadal oscillation
- Pacific Meridional Mode
- El Niño–Southern Oscillation (ENSO)
