= Pacific decadal oscillation =

Recurring pattern of climate variability

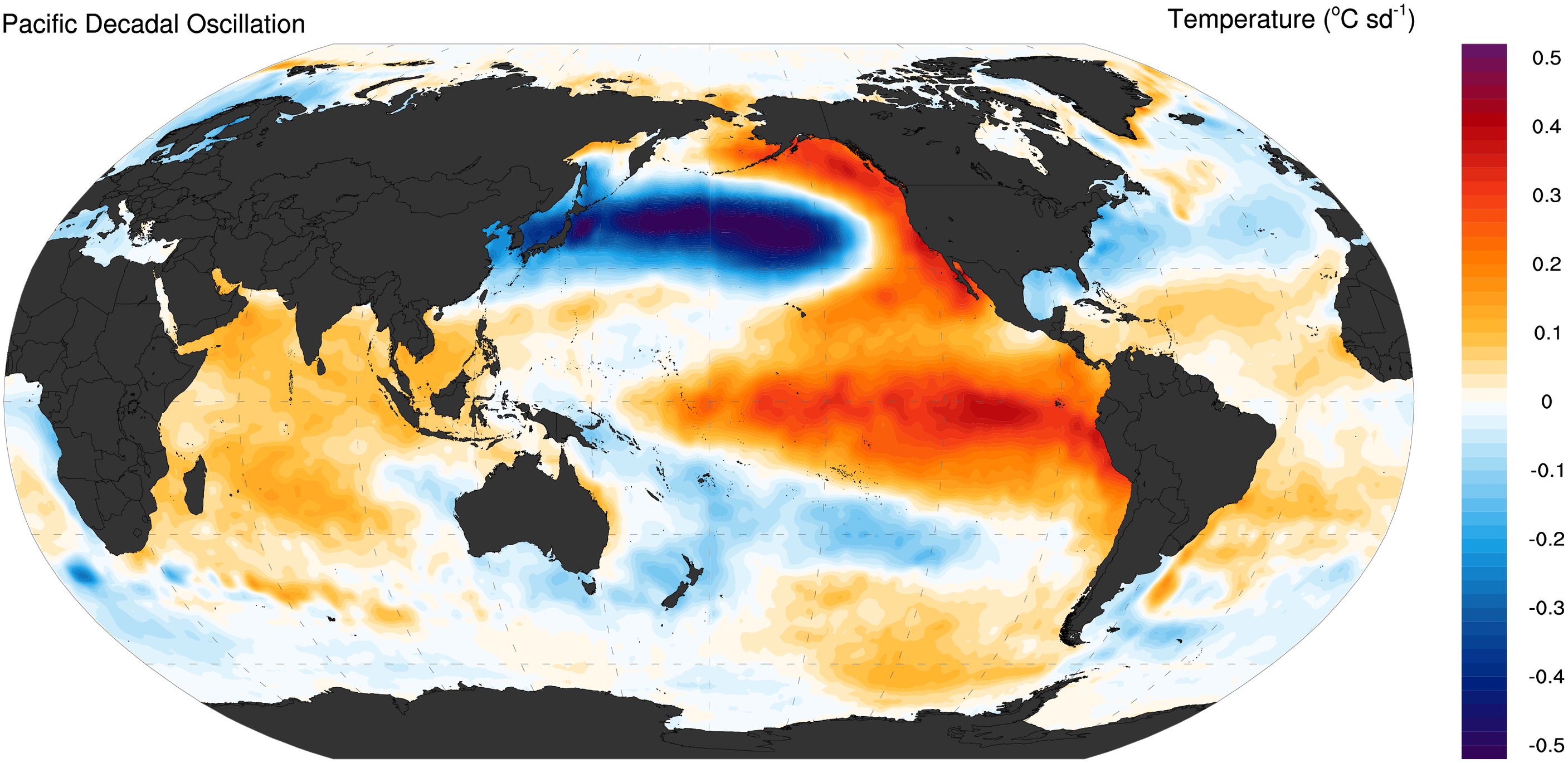
PDO positive phase global pattern

The Pacific decadal oscillation (PDO) is a robust, recurring pattern of ocean-atmosphere climate variability centered over the mid-latitude Pacific basin. The PDO is detected as warm or cool surface waters in the Pacific Ocean, north of 20°N. During the past century, the amplitude of this climate pattern has varied irregularly at interannual-to-interdecadal time scales, meaning, time periods of a few years to as much as time periods of multiple decades.

There is evidence of reversals in the prevailing polarity (meaning, changes in cool surface waters versus warm surface waters within the region) of the oscillation that occurred around 1925, 1947, and 1977. The last two reversals corresponded with dramatic shifts documented in salmon production regimes in the North Pacific Ocean. This climate pattern also affects coastal sea and continental surface air temperatures from Alaska to California.

During a "warm", or "positive", phase, the west Pacific becomes cooler and part of the eastern ocean warms; during a "cool", or "negative", phase, the opposite pattern occurs. The Pacific decadal oscillation was named by Steven R. Hare, who noticed the pattern while he was studying salmon production pattern results in 1997.

The Pacific decadal oscillation index is the leading empirical orthogonal function (EOF) of monthly sea surface temperature anomalies (SST-A) over the North Pacific (poleward of 20°N) after the global average sea surface temperature has been removed. This PDO index is the standardized principal component time series.

A PDO 'signal' has been reconstructed that reaches as far back as 1661 using existing scientific records that exist through tree-ring chronologies in the Baja California area.

== Mechanisms ==
Several studies have indicated that the PDO index may be reconstructed as the superposition of tropical forcing and extra-tropical processes. Thus, unlike the El Niño–Southern Oscillation (ENSO) that exists south of the equator, the PDO is not a single physical mode of ocean variability, but rather, the sum of several processes with different dynamic origins.

At inter-annual time scales the PDO index is reconstructed as the sum of random and ENSO induced variability in the Aleutian Low, whereas, on decadal timescales ENSO teleconnections, stochastic atmospheric forcing and changes in the North Pacific oceanic gyre circulation contribute approximately equally. Additionally, sea surface temperature anomalies have some winter to winter persistence due to the reemergence mechanism.

ENSO teleconnections, the atmospheric bridge

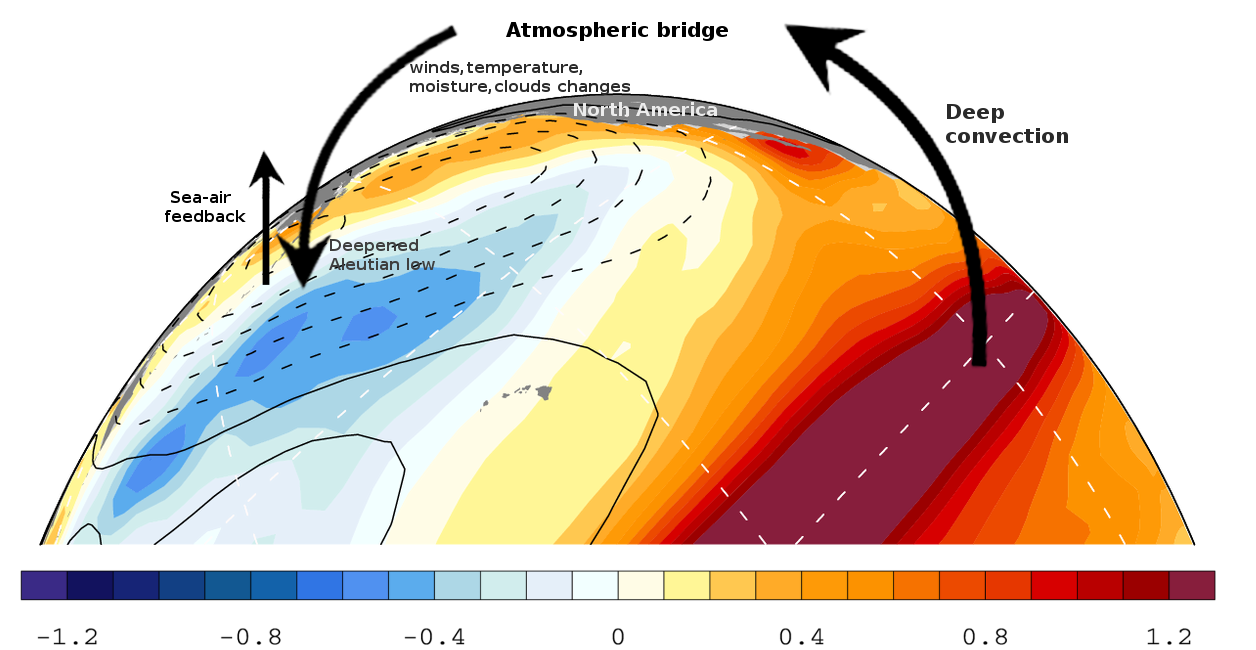
The atmospheric bridge during an El Niño event

ENSO can influence the global circulation pattern thousands of kilometers away from the equatorial Pacific through the "atmospheric bridge". During El Niño events, deep convection and heat transfer to the troposphere is enhanced over the anomalously warm sea surface temperature, this ENSO-related tropical forcing generates Rossby waves that propagate poleward and eastward and, are subsequently refracted back from the pole to the tropics. The planetary waves form at preferred locations both in the North and South Pacific Ocean, and the teleconnection pattern is established within 2–6 weeks. ENSO driven patterns modify surface temperature, humidity, wind, and the distribution of clouds over the North Pacific that alter surface heat, momentum, and freshwater fluxes and thus induce sea surface temperature, salinity, and mixed layer depth (MLD) anomalies.

The atmospheric bridge is more effective during boreal winter, when the deepened Aleutian Low results in stronger and cold northwesterly winds over the central Pacific and warm-humid southerly winds along the North American west coast, the associated changes in the surface heat fluxes and, to a lesser extent Ekman transport creates negative sea surface temperature anomalies and a deepened MLD in the central Pacific and warm the ocean from Hawaii to the Bering Sea.

SST reemergence

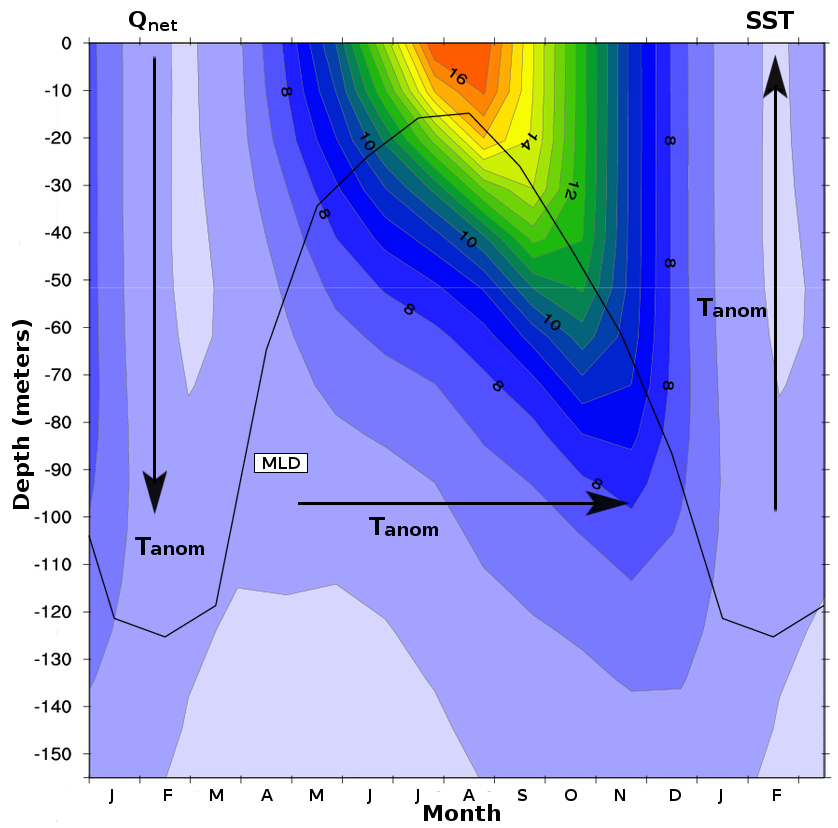
Reemergence mechanism in the North Pacific

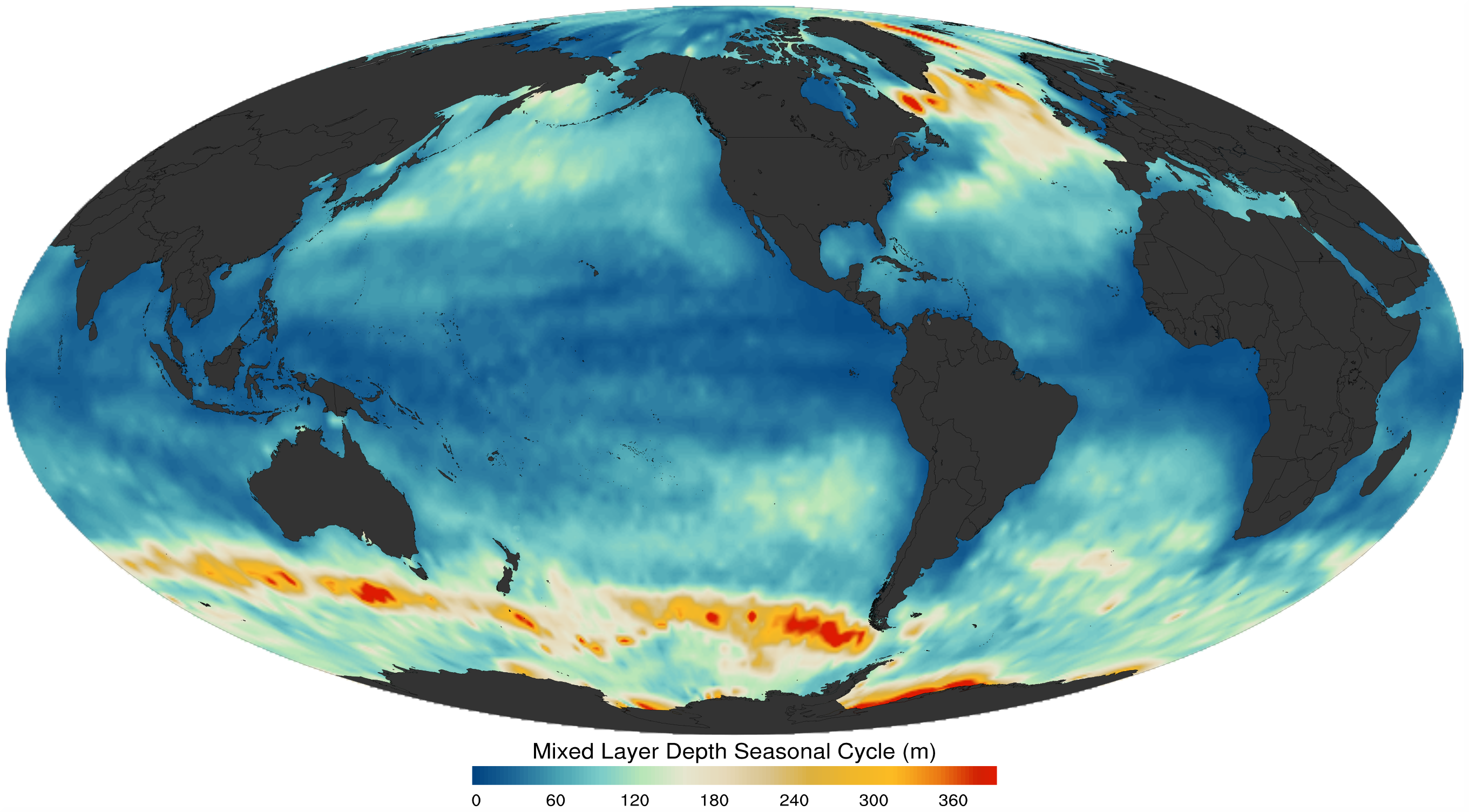
Mixed layer depth seasonal cycle

Midlatitude SST anomaly patterns tend to recur from one winter to the next, but not during the intervening summer, this process occurs because of the strong mixed layer seasonal cycle. The mixed layer depth over the North Pacific is deeper, typically 100-200m, in winter than it is in summer and thus, SST anomalies that form during winter and extend to the base of the mixed layer are sequestered beneath the shallow summer mixed layer when it reforms in late spring and, are insulated effectively from the air-sea heat flux.

When the mixed layer deepens again in the following autumn-early winter the anomalies may again influence the surface. This process has been entitled "reemergence mechanism" by Alexander and Deser and the process is observed over much of the North Pacific Ocean although it is more effective in the west where the winter mixed layer is deeper and the seasonal cycle greater.

Stochastic atmospheric forcing

Long term sea surface temperature variation may be induced by random atmospheric forcings that are integrated and reddened into the ocean mixed layer. The stochastic climate model paradigm was proposed by Frankignoul and Hasselmann, in this model a stochastic forcing, represented by the passage of storms, alter the ocean mixed layer temperature via surface energy fluxes and Ekman currents resulting in the system being damped due to the enhanced (reduced) heat loss to the atmosphere over the anomalously warm (cold) SST via turbulent energy and longwave radiative fluxes; in the simple case of a linear negative feedback the model may be written as the separable ordinary differential equation: ${\operatorname{d}y\over\operatorname{d}t}= v(t)- \lambda y$

where v is the random atmospheric forcing, λ is the damping rate (positive and constant) and y is the response.

The variance spectrum of y is: ${G(w) = \frac{F}{w^2 + \lambda ^2 }}$

where F is the variance of the white noise forcing and w is the frequency, an implication of this equation is that, at short time scales (w>>λ) the variance of the ocean temperature increase with the square of the period while at longer timescales(w<<λ, ~150 months) the damping process dominates and limits sea surface temperature anomalies so that the spectra became white.

Thus, an atmospheric white noise generates SST anomalies at much longer timescales, but without spectral peaks. Modeling studies suggest that this process contributes to as much as 1/3 of the PDO variability at decadal timescales.

Ocean dynamics

Several dynamic oceanic mechanisms and SST-air feedback may contribute to the observed decadal variability in the North Pacific Ocean. SST variability is stronger in the Kuroshio Oyashio extension (KOE) region and is associated with changes in the KOE axis and strength, that generates decadal and longer time scales SST variance, but without the observed magnitude of the spectral peak at ~10 years, and SST-air feedback. Remote reemergence occurs in regions of strong current such as the Kuroshio extension and the anomalies created near the Japan current may reemerge the next winter in the central pacific.

Advective resonance

Saravanan and McWilliams have demonstrated that the interaction between spatially coherent atmospheric forcing patterns and an advective ocean, shows periodicities at preferred time scales when non-local advective effects dominate over the local sea surface temperature damping. This "advective resonance" mechanism may generate decadal SST variability in the Eastern North Pacific that is associated with the anomalous Ekman advection and surface heat flux.

North Pacific oceanic gyre circulation

Dynamic gyre adjustments are essential to generate decadal SST peaks in the North Pacific, the process occurs via westward propagating oceanic Rossby waves that are forced by wind anomalies in the central and eastern Pacific Ocean. The quasi-geostrophic equation for long non-dispersive Rossby Waves forced by large scale wind stress may be written as the linear partial differential equation: ${\partial h\over\partial t} -c{\partial h\over\partial x} = \frac{-\nabla \times \vec{\tau}}{\rho_0f_0}$

where h is the upper-layer thickness anomaly, τ is the wind stress, c is the Rossby wave speed that depends on latitude, ρ_{0} is the density of sea water and f_{0} is the Coriolis parameter at a reference latitude. The response time scale is set by the Rossby waves speed, the location of the wind forcing and the basin width, at the latitude of the Kuroshio Extension c is 2.5 cm s^{−1}, and the dynamic gyre adjustment timescale is ~(5)10 years if the Rossby wave was initiated in the (central)eastern Pacific Ocean.

If the wind white forcing is uniform zonally, it should generate a red spectrum in which h variance increases with the period and reaches a constant amplitude at lower frequencies without decadal and interdecadal peaks, however, low frequencies atmospheric circulation tends to be dominated by fixed spatial patterns so that wind forcing is not zonally uniform, if the wind forcing is sinusoidal zonally then decadal peaks occurs due to resonance of the forced basin-scale Rossby waves.

The propagation of h anomalies in the western pacific changes the KOE axis and strength and impact SST due to the anomalous geostrophic heat transport. Studies during the 2000s suggest that Rossby waves excited by the Aleutian low propagate the PDO signal from the North Pacific to the KOE through changes in the KOE axis, while Rossby waves associated with the NPO propagate the North Pacific Gyre oscillation signal through changes in the KOE strength.

== Impacts ==
Temperature and precipitation

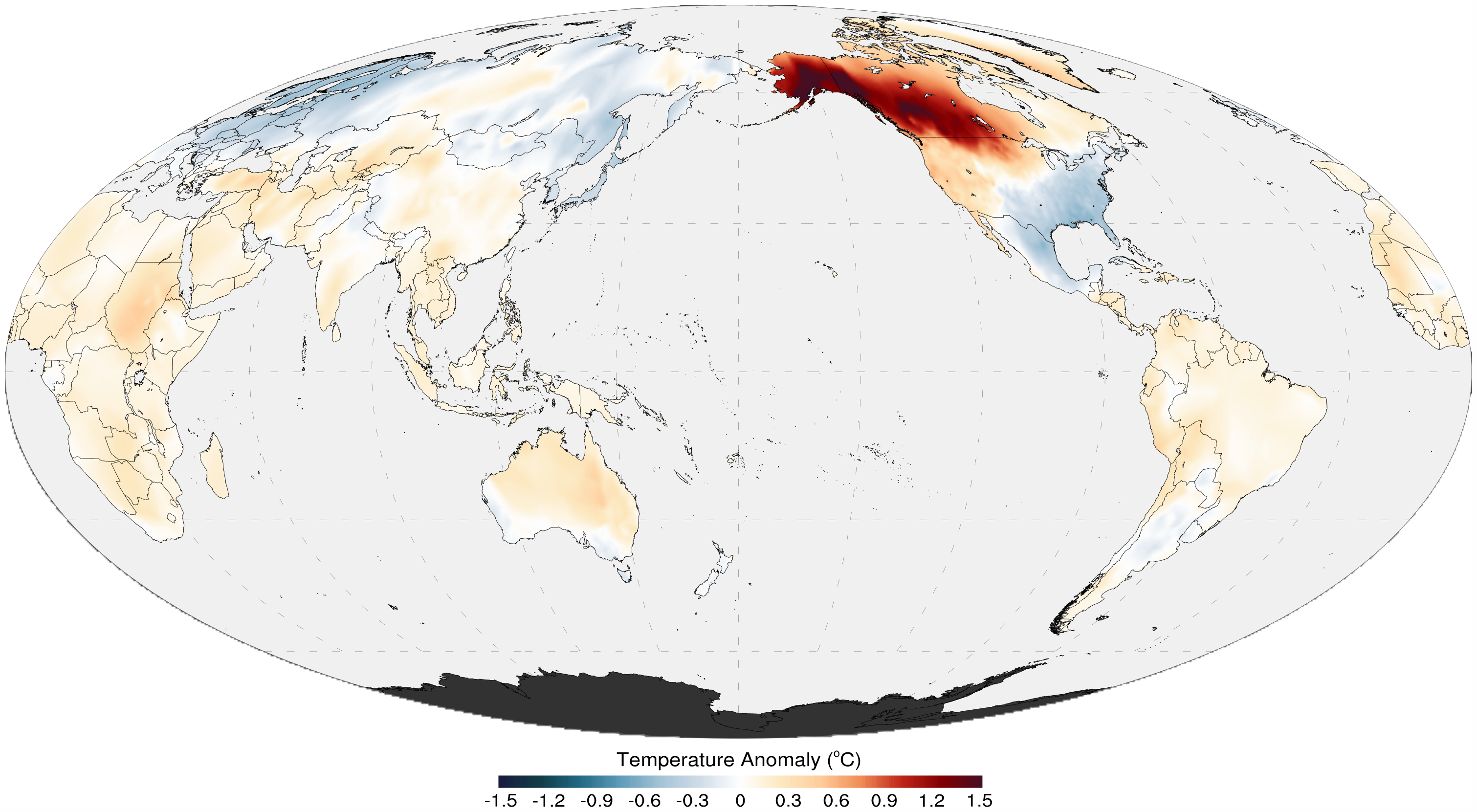
PDO DJFM temperature pattern

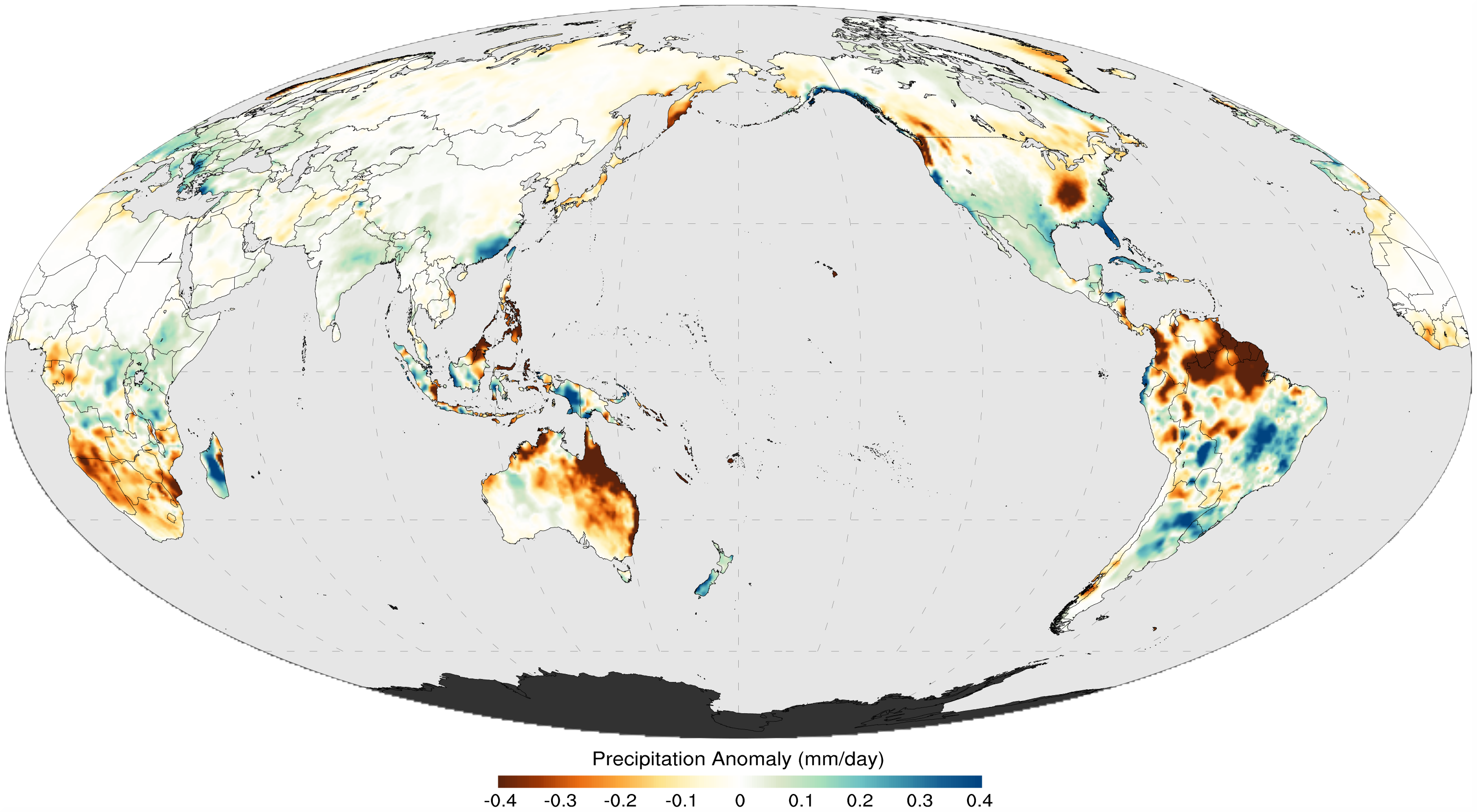
PDO DJFM precipitation pattern

The PDO spatial pattern and impacts are similar to those associated with ENSO events in the southern hemisphere. During the positive phase the wintertime Aleutian Low is deepened and shifted southward, warm-humid air is advected along the North American west coast and temperatures are higher than usual from the Pacific Northwest to Alaska, but below normal in Mexico and the Southeastern United States.

Winter precipitation is higher than usual in the Alaska Coast Range, Mexico, and the Southwestern United States, but reduced over Canada, Eastern Siberia, and Australia,
McCabe et al. showed that, along with the AMO, the PDO strongly influence multidecadal drought patterns in the United States, drought frequency is enhanced over much of the Northern United States during the positive PDO phase and over the Southwest United States during the negative PDO phase in both cases, if the PDO is associated with a positive AMO.
The Asian Monsoon also is affected, increased rainfall and decreased summer temperature is observed over the Indian subcontinent during the negative phase.

PDO Indicators	PDO positive phase	PDO negative phase
Temperature
Pacific Northwest, British Columbia, and Alaska	Above average	Below average
Mexico to Southeastern US	Below average	Above average
Precipitation
Alaska coastal range	Above average	Below average
Mexico to Southwestern US	Above average	Below average
Canada, Eastern Siberia, and Australia	Below average	Above average
India summer monsoon	Below average	Above average

== Reconstructions and regime shifts ==
Observed monthly values for the PDO (1900–September 2019, dots) and 10-year averages

Reconstructed PDO Index (993-1996)

The PDO index has been reconstructed using tree rings and other hydrologically sensitive proxies from west North America and Asia.

MacDonald and Case reconstructed the PDO back to the year 993 using tree rings from California and Alberta. The index shows a 50–70 year periodicity, but is a strong mode of variability only after 1800, a persistent negative phase occurring during a a warm period during medieval times (993–1300) that is consistent with the absence of El Niño conditions reconstructed in the tropical Pacific and multi-century droughts in the Southwest United States.

Several regime shifts are apparent in both the reconstructions and instrumental data, during the twentieth century regime shifts associated with concurrent changes in SST, SLP, land precipitation and ocean cloud cover occurred in 1924/1925, 1945/1946, and 1976/1977:

- 1750: PDO displays an unusually strong oscillation.
- 1924/1925: PDO changed to a "warm" phase.
- 1945/1946: PDO changed to a "cool" phase, the pattern of this regime shift is similar to the 1970s episode with maximum amplitude in the subarctic and subtropical front, but with a greater signature near the Japan current while the 1970s shift was stronger near the American west coast.
- 1976/1977: PDO changed to a "warm" phase.
- 1988/1989: A weakening of the Aleutian low with associated SST changes was observed, in contrast to other regime shifts this change appears to be related to concurrent extratropical oscillation in the North Pacific and North Atlantic rather than tropical processes.
- 1997/1998: Several changes in sea surface temperature and marine ecosystem occurred in the North Pacific after 1997/1998, in contrast to prevailing anomalies observed after the 1970s shift. The SST declined along the United States west coast and substantial changes in the populations of salmon, anchovy, and sardine were observed as the PDO changed back to a cool "anchovy" phase. However, the spatial pattern of the SST change was different with a meridional SST seesaw in the central and western Pacific that resembled a strong shift in the North Pacific Gyre Oscillation rather than the PDO structure. This pattern dominated much of the North Pacific SST variability after 1989.
- The 2014 flip from the cool PDO phase to the warm phase, which vaguely resembles a long and drawn-out El Niño event, contributed to record-breaking surface temperatures across the planet in 2014.

== Predictability ==
The NOAA Earth System Research Laboratory produces official ENSO forecasts, and Experimental statistical forecasts using a linear inverse modeling (LIM) method to predict the PDO, LIM assumes that the PDO may be separated into a linear deterministic component and a non-linear component represented by random fluctuations.

Much of the LIM PDO predictability arises from ENSO and the global trend rather than extra-tropical processes and thus, is limited to ~4 seasons. The prediction is consistent with the seasonal footprinting mechanism wherein 6–10 months later, an optimal SST structure evolves into the ENSO mature phase that subsequently impacts the North Pacific Ocean SST via the atmospheric bridge.

Skills in predicting decadal PDO variability could arise from taking into account the impact of the externally forced and internally generated Pacific variability.

== Related patterns ==
- The interdecadal Pacific oscillation (IPO) is a similar, but less localised phenomenon; it covers the Southern hemisphere as well (50°S to 50°N).
- ENSO tends to lead PDO cycling.
- Shifts in the IPO change the location and strength of ENSO activity. The South Pacific convergence zone moves northeast during El Niño events and southwest during the absence of El Niño events. The same movement takes place during positive IPO and negative IPO phases respectively. (Folland et al., 2002)
- Interdecadal temperature variations in China are closely related to those of the NAO and the NPO.
- The amplitudes of the NAO and NPO increased in the 1960s and interannual variation patterns changed from 3–4 years to 8–15 years.
- Sea level rise is affected when large areas of water warm and expand, or cool and contract.
- The Great Drought of 1968 in Chile has been found to have coincided with an overlap of an absence of an El Niño event and a cold period of the Pacific decadal oscillation from 1965 to 1976.

== See also ==
- California Current
- Hadley cell
- Ocean heat content
- Pacific–North American teleconnection pattern
- North Pacific Oscillation
- North Atlantic oscillation
- Atlantic multidecadal oscillation (AMO)
- El Niño Southern Oscillation (ENSO)
- Pacific Meridional Mode (PMM)
