= Karin Holmgren =

Swedish biologist and geographer (born 1959)

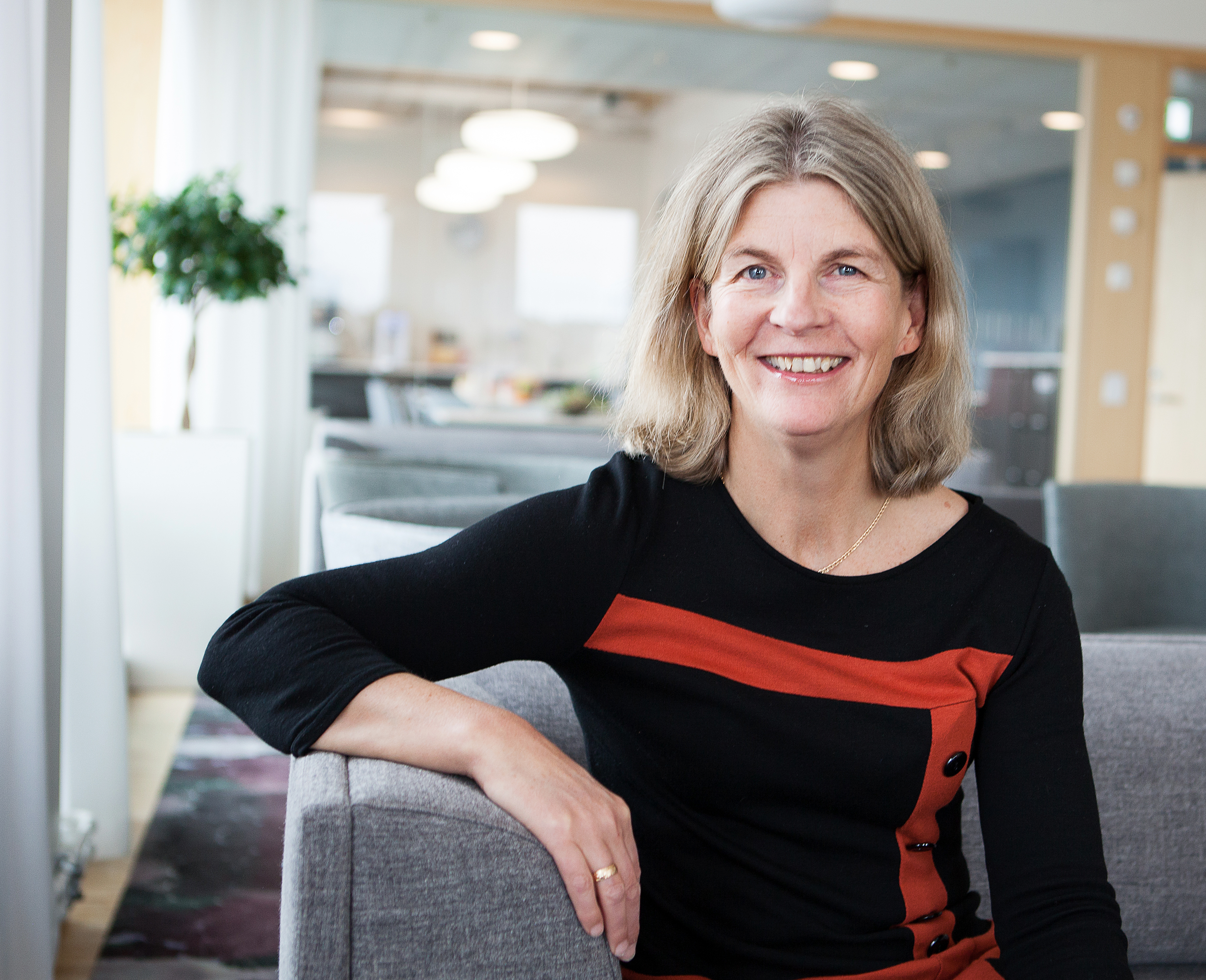
- Born: 1959 (age 66–67)
- Occupation: Geographer

Karin Holmgren (born 1959) is a Swedish biologist and geographer. She is a professor of natural geography and is the deputy chancellor of the Swedish University of Agricultural Sciences since 1 January 2019.

== Career ==
Holmgren studied biology and geosciences at Stockholm University.

Holmgren worked with the Swedish International Development Cooperation Agency (Sida) in Tanzania for three years and for two years at Sida's main office in Stockholm.

During 2010-2015, Holmgren was the director of the strategic partnership Navarino Environmental Observatory between Stockholm University, the Academy of Sciences in Athens and the Greek ecotourism company TEMES.

Since 1 March 2016, Holmgren is a professor in natural geography at the Department of Urban and Rural Development. As of 1 January 2019, Holmgren is the acting vice-chancellor of the Swedish University of Agricultural Sciences.
