= Great Salinity Anomaly =

Significant disturbance caused by a major pulse of freshwater input to the Nordic Seas

The Great Salinity Anomaly (GSA) originally referred to an event in the late 1960s to early 1970s where a large influx of freshwater from the Arctic Ocean led to a salinity anomaly in the northern North Atlantic Ocean, which affected the Atlantic meridional overturning circulation. Since then, the term "Great Salinity Anomaly" has been applied to successive occurrences of the same phenomenon, including the Great Salinity Anomaly of the 1980s and the Great Salinity Anomaly of the 1990s. The Great Salinity Anomalies were advective events, propagating to different sea basins and areas of the North Atlantic, and were on the decadal-scale for the anomalies in the 1970s, 1980s, and 1990s.

== Salinity anomaly occurrences ==
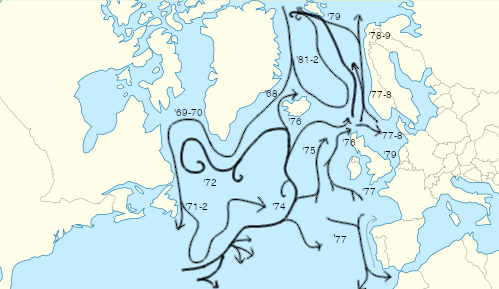
A scheme of the approximate propagation of the GSA minima in the 1970s, with approximate dates indicated.

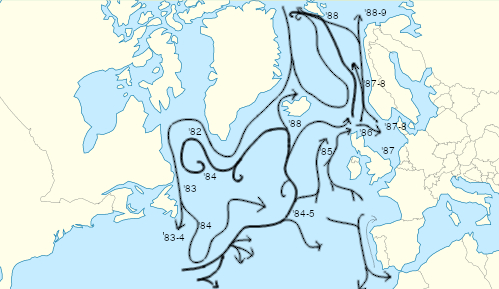
A scheme of the approximate propagation of the GSA minima in the 1980s, with approximate dates indicated.

The Great Salinity Anomalies of the 1970s and 1980s were well-documented decadal-scale events, where minima in salinity (and temperature) were observed successively in different basins around the northern North Atlantic Ocean. The fact that the anomaly was observed in different basins after each other indicates that this was an advective event, accounted for by the movement of a fresh (and cold) anomaly along main ocean currents. For the 1970s GSA, the propagation was traceable around the Atlantic sub-polar gyre from its origins in the northeast of Iceland in the mid- to late- 1960s until its return to the Greenland Sea in 1981–82. The 1980s GSA began with the anomaly being advected by the West Greenland Current in 1982 and ending up back in north Icelandic waters in 1989–90.

=== How salinity is measured ===
Salinity is a measure of how 'salty' water is, or the amount of dissolved matter within seawater. This is measured by passing seawater through a very fine filter to remove particulate matter. Historically, this was measured using a glass fibre filter with a nominal pore size of 0.45 $\mu m$. More recently, though, smaller and smaller pores have been used.

Salinity is difficult to measure directly as dissolved matter in seawater is a complicated mixture of virtually every known element and it is impossible to measure to complete composition of every water sample. Originally, chlorinity (the measure of the chloride content, by mass, of seawater) was measured and converted to salinity using a simple linear function. Since the early 1980s, the value calculated as salinity is actually the Practical Salinity, which is a proxy for the true salinity. The new seawater standard TEOS-10 defined a better measure of salinity used since 2010, named Absolute Salinity. This is measured by first measuring the electrical conductivity, temperature, and pressure of a water parcel. The electrical conductivity of a water sample is influenced by the concentration and composition of dissolved salts, as salts increase the ability of a solution to conduct an electrical current.

For the GSA's, the difference in salinity compared to a reference salinity is used in order to identify the anomaly, and salinity is measured using the practical salinity values, which are unitless.

== Causes ==
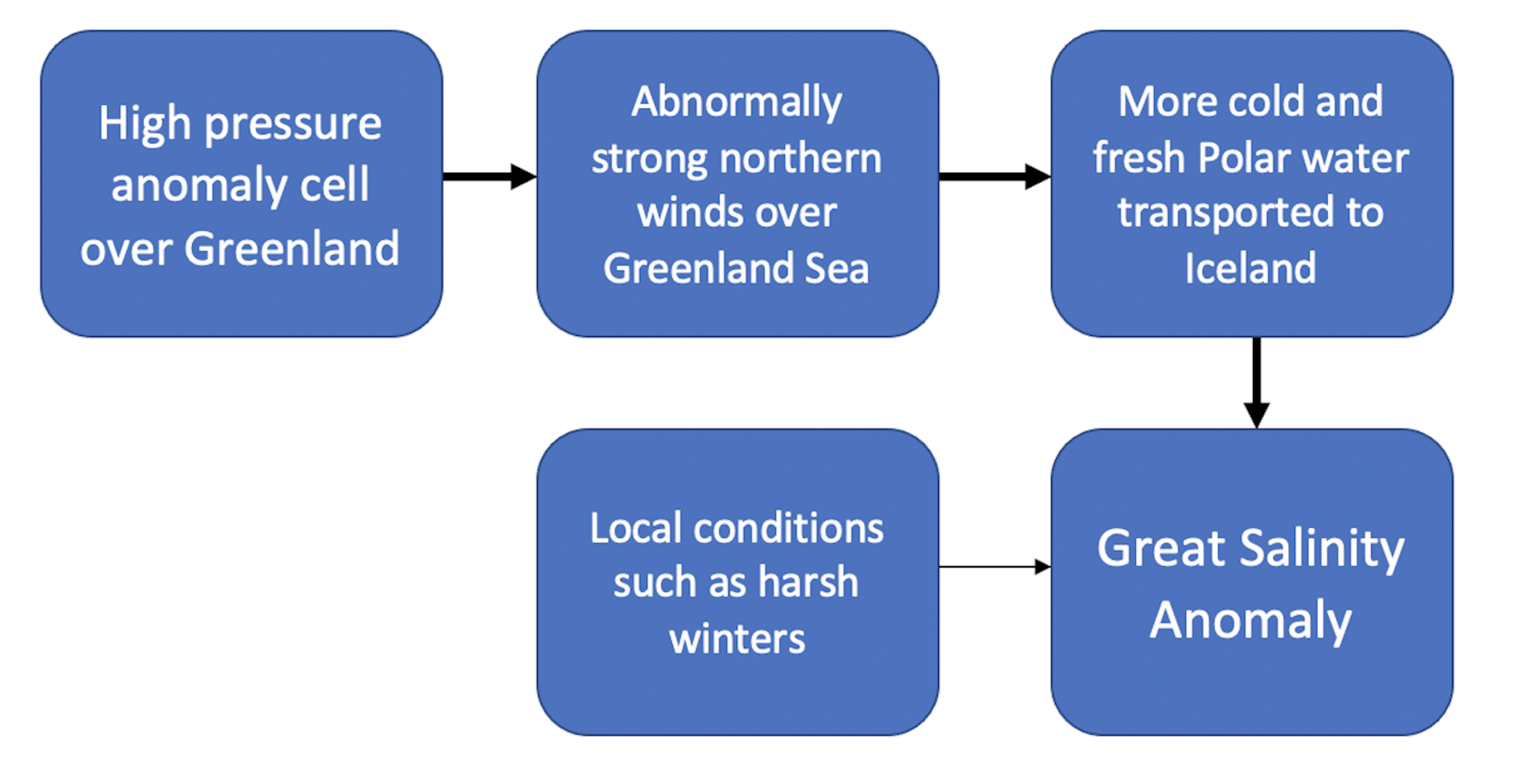
A schematic showing the causes of the GSA of the 1970s. The thinner line indicates a weaker cause than a thicker line.

In the North Atlantic Ocean, the high salinity of northward-flowing upper waters leads to the formation of deep, cold, dense waters at the high latitudes. This is a vital driver of the meridional overturning circulation (MOC). Increasing the influx of fresh water (which is less dense than saltier water) lowers the salinity of the upper layers, leading to a cold, fresh, light upper layer once cooled by the atmosphere. In turn, this deep water driver of the MOC is weakened, in turn weakening the MOC.

The GSA's observed could have different driving causes. For the anomaly in the late 1960s and early 1970s, the main cause of the anomaly was by a freshwater and sea ice pulse which came from the Arctic Ocean via the Fram Strait. Studies show an indirect cause of this pulse to be abnormally strong northern winds over the Greenland Sea, which brought more cold and fresh polar water to Iceland, which was in turn caused by a high pressure anomaly cell over Greenland in the 1960s. This is known as a remote cause of GSA's. However, local conditions such as cold weather are also important for the preservation of a GSA, in order to stop the anomaly being mixed out and allowing it to propagate as the GSA of the 1970s did.

As for the anomaly of the 1980s, the cause is likely to be more local. This GSA was likely caused by the extremely severe winters of the early 1980s in the Labrador Sea and the Baffin Sea. However, as with the earlier GSA, there is also the remote aspect - the GSA was likely supplemented by Arctic freshwater outflow.

== Potential Consequences ==
It is possible that the Great Salinity Anomaly in the 1960s affected the convection pattern and the Atlantic meridional overturning circulation (AMOC). The AMOC is a large system of ocean currents that carry warm water from the tropics northwards to the North Atlantic. This is measured by calculating the difference in sea surface temperature between the Northern and Southern Hemisphere averages, which is used as a proxy for AMOC variations. In the years of 1967–1972, this difference dropped by 0.39, which indicates a colder state for the AMOC. This abrupt change indicates that the AMOC was in a weaker state, with a recovery to the warmer state occurring by the late 1980s.

A weaker AMOC leads to less heat being transported northwards, which leads to a cooling in the Northern Hemisphere and a warming in the Southern Hemisphere. On a global scale, this would lead to a slight cooling in global mean surface temperature in the long term. A weaker AMOC also could reduce rainfall in regions that experience cooling, due to reduced evaporation from the ocean into the atmosphere. Furthermore, a weakened AMOC state would slow the pace of future Arctic sea ice loss, which is consistent with the cooling it would cause in the Northern Hemisphere.

== Further Research ==
Recent studies (2017) suggest a potential subpolar North Atlantic (SPG) convection collapse, resulting in rapid North Atlantic cooling, and assess the AMOC slowing or shutdown.

=== Recent Anomalies ===
From the years of 2012–2016, the largest and most rapid change in salinity since the GSA has been observed. However, this 'freshening signal' is limited to the Icelandic basin, the Rockall Trough, and downstream into the southern Norwegian Sea – there is no similar signal in the Labrador Sea, as with previous GSA's. This is because the earlier GSA's were due to the addition of freshwater through the Fram Strait, with the wind pattern spreading this freshwater over the Labrador Sea. For this recent anomaly, the processes driving it were different.
