= Middle Bronze Age Cold Epoch =

Period of unusually cold climate in the North Atlantic region

The Middle Bronze Age Cold Epoch was a period of unusually cold climate in the North Atlantic region that lasted about from 1800 BC to 1500 BC. It was followed by the Bronze Age Optimum (1500—900 BC).

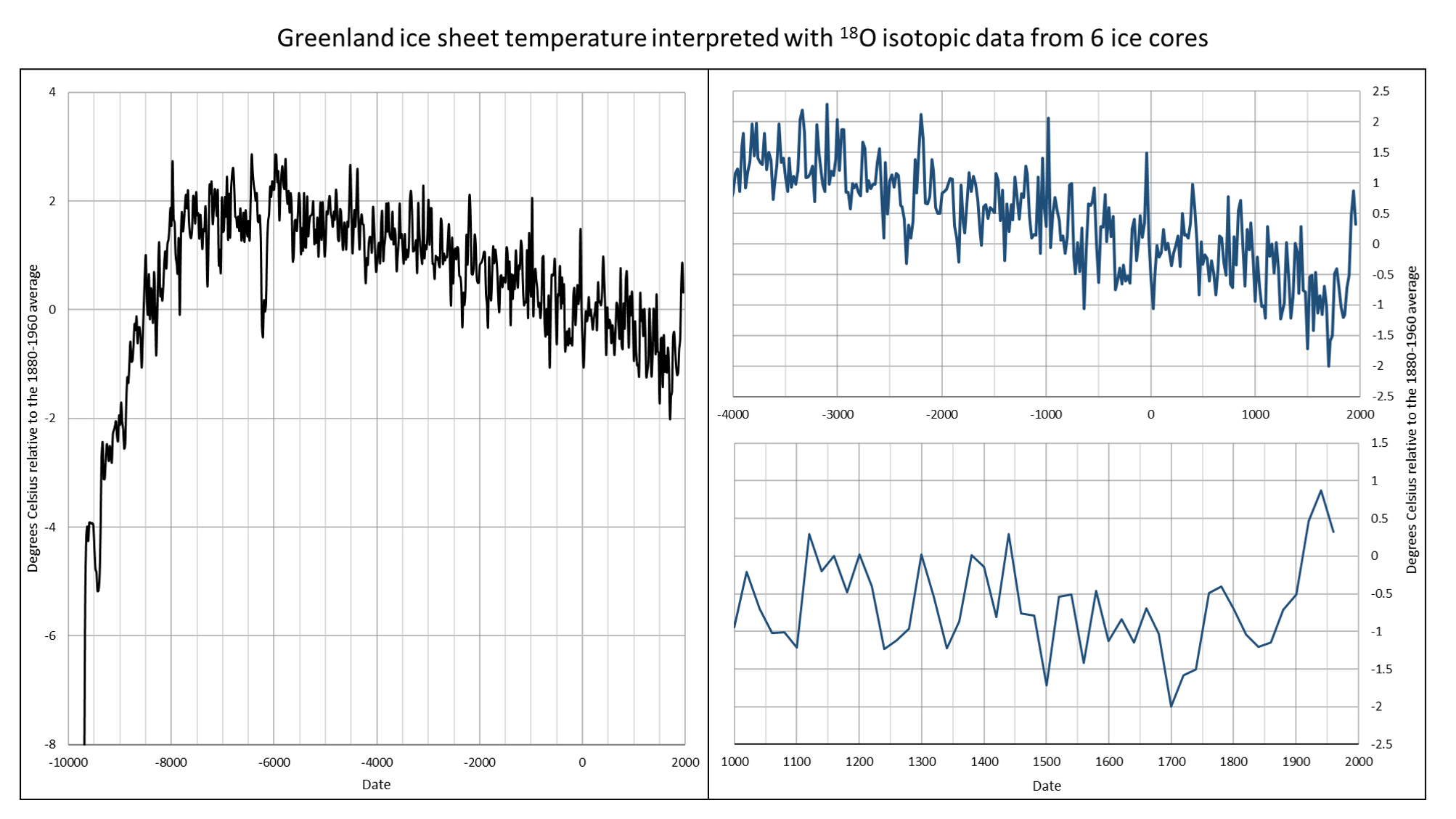
Greenland ice sheet temperatures interpreted with 18O isotope from 6 ice cores (Vinther, B., et al., 2009)

During the Middle Bronze Age Cold Epoch, a series of severe volcanic eruptions occurred, including Mount Vesuvius (Avellino eruption, about 1660 BC), Mount Aniakchak (about 1645 BC), and Thera (Minoan eruption, about 1620 BC). It was replaced by the climatic optimum of the late Bronze Age 1500-900 BC .

Preceded by	Middle Bronze Age Cold Epoch; 1800 BC– 1500 BC	Succeeded by Bronze Age Optimum
