= Western Hemisphere Warm Pool =

Water temperature description

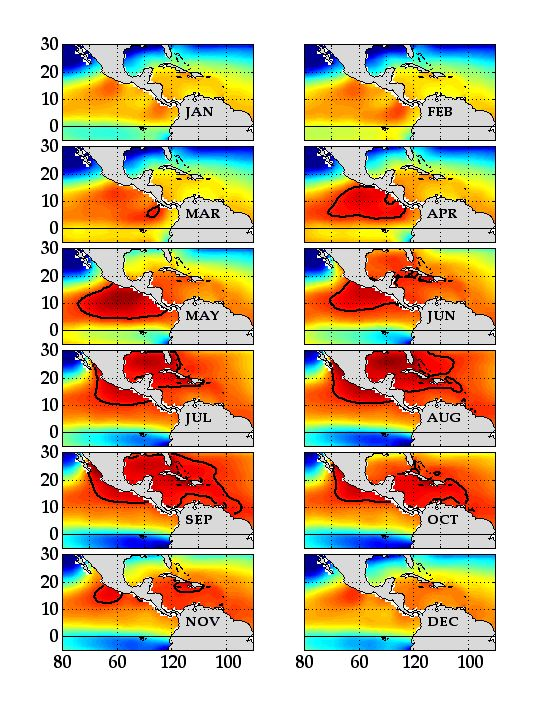
Annual cycle of the WHWP

The Western Hemisphere Warm Pool (WHWP) is a region of sea surface temperatures (SST) warmer than 28.5 °C that develops west of Central America in the spring, then expands to the tropical waters to the east.

The WHWP includes the tropical Atlantic Ocean (TNA) east of the Lesser Antilles, Caribbean Sea, Gulf of Mexico, and eastern north Pacific Ocean (ENP).

A WHWP heating cycle begins with warmth in the eastern North Pacific in the spring. A dipole pattern off Central America appears due to surges of cooler, drier air through the gap at the Isthmus of Tehuantepec. During spring, the warm pools grow and merge. Their warmth and moisture feed the Mexican monsoon. By summer, the warmth spreads across the Gulf of Mexico and Caribbean areas.

== Relationship with Atlantic hurricanes ==
Recent studies have shown that the Atlantic portion of the WHWP (AWP) is significantly correlated with Atlantic hurricane activity. A large (or small) AWP reduces (or increases) the tropospheric vertical wind shear in the main development region for Atlantic hurricanes and increases (or decreases) the moist static instability of the troposphere, both of which favor (or do not favor) the intensification of tropical storms into major hurricanes.

== Relationship with El Niño ==
A study of climate records has shown a relationship between El Niño and the Western Hemisphere Warm Pool (WHWP). During a normal Northern Hemisphere winter, diabatic heating over the Amazon drives a Hadley cell with descending air over an anticyclone north of 20°N in the subtropical North Atlantic and associated northeast trade winds between Africa and the Caribbean. An El Niño weakens the Amazonian cell, the anticyclone and the easterly tradewinds, causing the tropical North Atlantic to warm more than usual in the spring. About half of El Niño events persist sufficiently into the spring months for the warm pool to become unusually large by summer.

== Climate events in area ==
- 800–900: Collapse of Classical Maya civilization due to drought. Yucatán Peninsula in present-day Mexico.
