= Interdecadal Pacific oscillation =

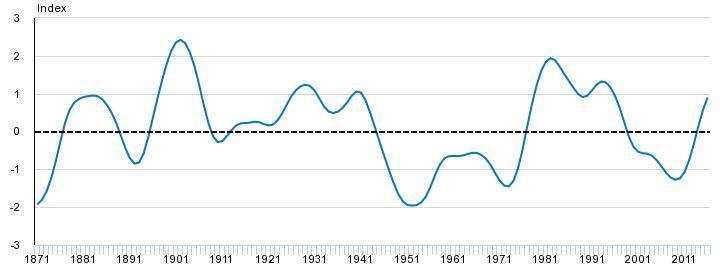
Annual average index of the Pacific Interdecadal Oscillation The annual average is calculated by the average of the IPO quarterly averages for each year (Met Office, Hadley Centre for Climate Change, 2016).

The Interdecadal Pacific Oscillation (IPO) is an oceanographic and meteorological phenomenon affecting climate variability over the Pacific basin and beyond on interdecadal time scales.

The term was introduced in the late 1990s to describe an observed, near-global pattern of ENSO-like interdecadal sea-surface temperature variability. Multiple independently derived indices of Pacific climate variability exhibit similar temporal evolution to the IPO on interdecadal time scales despite differences in methodology and spatial domain.

The IPO is closely related to the Pacific decadal oscillation (PDO), although the PDO is centred in the North Pacific, whereas the IPO spans both hemispheres and much of the tropical Pacific.

The IPO has been linked to interdecadal variability in Pacific climate and rainfall patterns, including shifts in the South Pacific Convergence Zone and associated rainfall variability across Pacific Island countries and surrounding regions.

The IPO has also been associated with interdecadal variability in ENSO teleconnections and ENSO-related impacts on rainfall, temperature, river flow, and agricultural production in regions including Australia and parts of Asia and the Americas.

The IPO is evident in both observations and coupled climate model simulations, and may arise partly as a residual of interdecadal changes in ENSO activity, although oceanic processes and tropical–extratropical interactions may also contribute.
