= Centers of action =

In meteorology, centers of action are extensive and almost stationary low or high pressure areas which control the movement of atmospheric disturbances over a large area. This does not mean that the position of the center is constant over a specific area but that the monthly atmospheric pressure corresponds to a high or a low pressure.

The French meteorologist Léon Teisserenc de Bort was the first in 1881 to apply this term to maxima and minima of pressure on daily charts. The main centers of action in the Northern Hemisphere are the Icelandic Low, the Aleutian Low, the Azores/Bermuda High, the Pacific High, the Siberian High (in winter), and the Asiatic Low (in summer). Sir Gilbert Walker used the same term to relate meteorological elements in a region to weather in the following season in other regions for the Southern Oscillation.

== Causes ==
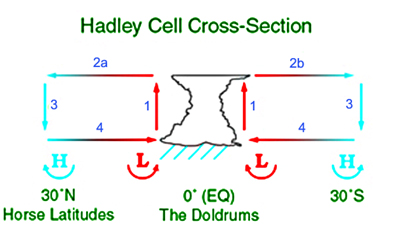
Hadley cells transporting heat and humidity from the Tropics to Mid-latitudes.

In the region called the Horse latitudes, between 30 and 35 degrees of latitude North or South, there is a series of semi-permanent anticyclones on the downward side of the Hadley cell of the general atmospheric circulation. The thermal contrasts over oceanic waters leads to the formation of these centers of action as a direct convective circulation is established between the equator and higher latitudes in a very weak Coriolis force zone. The Azores/Bermuda High is found in this zone.

Similarly, low pressure areas are formed in the oceanic circulation near the Polar regions were sea water is much warmer than the land. Such centers are the Icelandic Low, the Aleutian Low and numerous lows near the coast of Antarctica.

Finally, in both hemispheres, there are centers of action inland in large continental zones where cold or warm air can be trapped by surrounding mountainous zones or high contrast or temperature by surrounding seas. This is the case for Siberia where the temperature is very cold in winter forming the Siberian High, or very hot in summer to give a thermal low in summer. Antarctica is so cold in all seasons that it has a permanent anticyclone at its center.

== Climatology ==
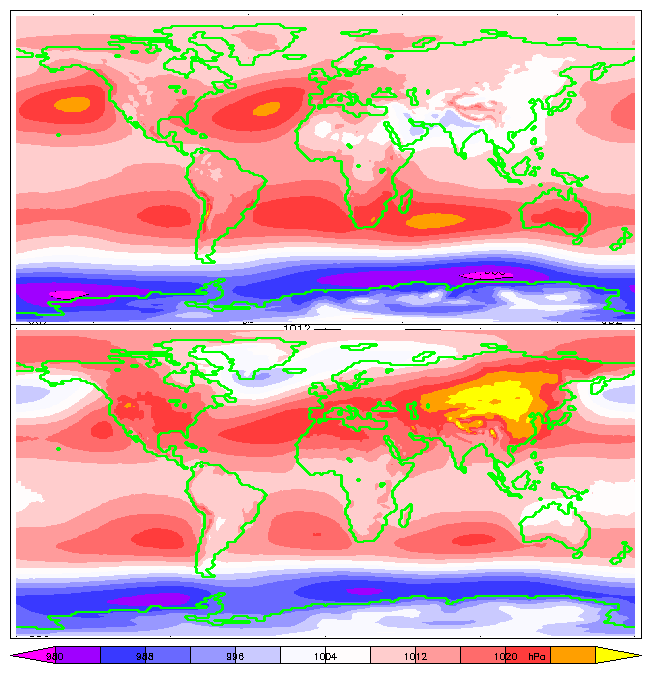
Distribution of the centers of action (June–July–August at top and December–January–February at bottom)

The intensity of these systems vary during the year depending on the temperature of water and air. The action centers falter when the temperature contrasts decrease and conversely, they reinforce when these increases. Their position also varies, always following the maximum contrast. For example, the Azores anticyclone moves between the Azores and Bermuda, according to the position of the Gulf Stream and the difference in warming between the Poles and the equator.

The distribution of the action centers in the Southern Hemisphere changes far less than in the Northern Hemisphere during the year because the landmass in that hemisphere is relatively small. Apart from a thermal anticyclone over Australia during the southern winter, the centers of action are fairly stable over the oceans. The southern parts of the Atlantic, Indian, and Pacific oceans have three anticyclones over the Horse latitudes. Further South, a fairly continuous series of low pressure areas cover the ocean near Antarctica during the whole year and does the Antarctica High over the continent.
