= Pacific–North American teleconnection pattern =

Large-scale weather pattern with two modes

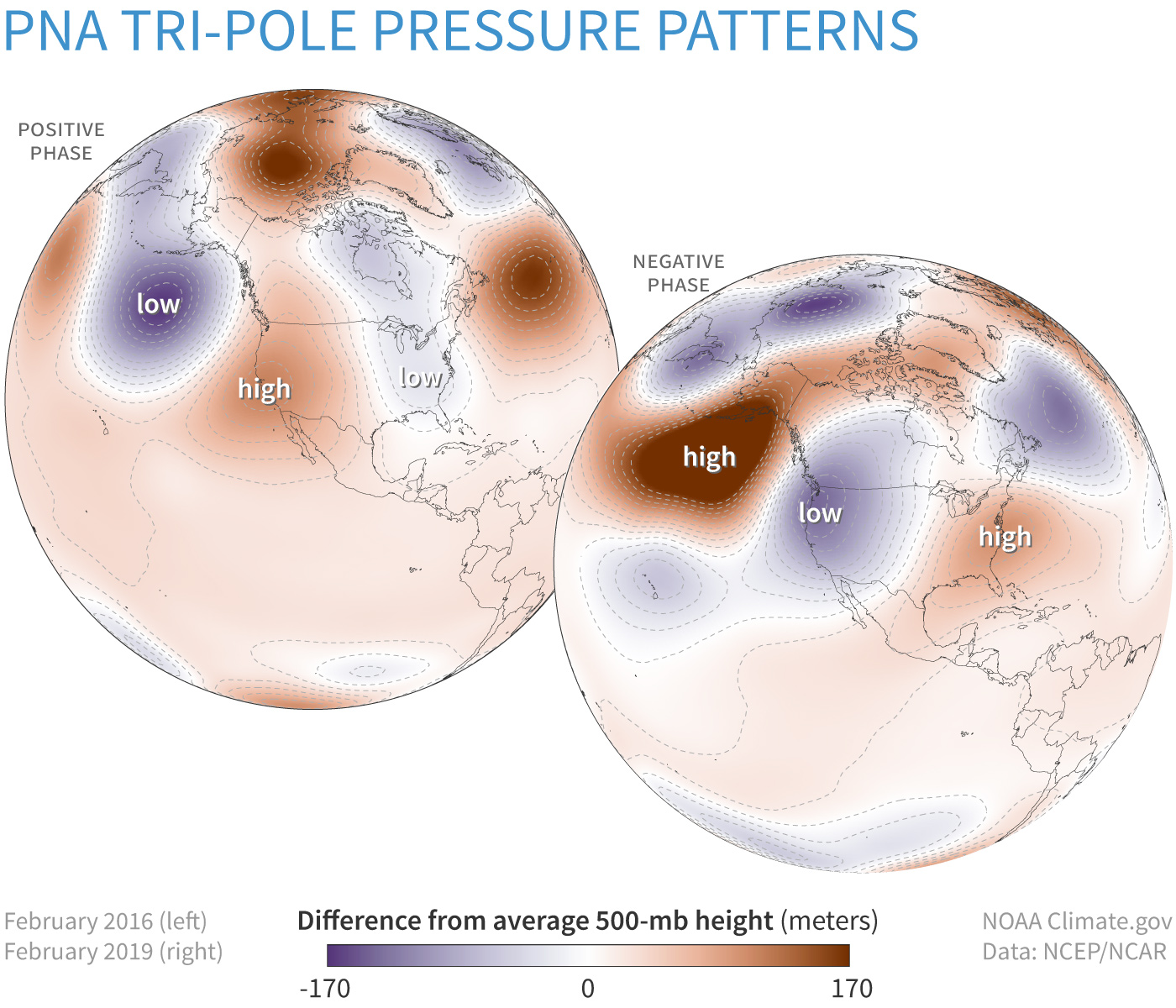
An example of positive PNA (left) and negative PNA (right), based on anomalies in the geopotential height of the 500 hPa pressure level

The Pacific–North American teleconnection pattern (PNA) is a large-scale weather pattern with two modes, denoted positive and negative, and which relates the atmospheric circulation pattern over the North Pacific Ocean with the one over the North American continent. It is the second leading mode of natural climate variability in the higher latitudes of the Northern Hemisphere (behind the Arctic Oscillation or North Atlantic Oscillation) and can be diagnosed using the arrangement of anomalous geopotential heights or air pressures over the North Pacific and North America.

On average, the troposphere over North America features a ridge on the western part of the continent and a trough over the eastern part of the continent. The positive phase of the PNA teleconnection is identified by anomalously low geopotential heights south of the Aleutian Islands and over Southeastern U.S. straddling high geopotential heights over the North Pacific from Hawaii to the U.S. Intermountain West. This represents an amplification of the long-term average conditions. The negative phase features the opposite pattern over the same regions, with above-average geopotential heights straddling below-average heights. This represents a damping of the long-term average conditions.

== Indices ==
The PNA is typically quantified using an index using geopotential height anomalies at the 500-hPa pressure level, with positive and negative PNA phases based on the sign of the index. Wallace and Gutzler (1981) expressed the PNA index as the average of normalized height anomalies at the four centers of action most relevant to the PNA,

$$\text{PNA}_4 = \frac{1}{4}(z^*(20^{\circ}\text{N}, 160^{\circ}\text{W}) - z^*(45^{\circ}\text{N}, 165^{\circ}\text{W}) + z^*(55^{\circ}\text{N}, 115^{\circ}\text{W}) - z^*(30^{\circ}\text{N}, 85^{\circ}\text{W}))$$

where $z^*$ describes the normalized 500-hPa height anomaly as a function of location. The subtropical center at (20°N, 160°W) can be excluded, though the difference between the resulting $\text{PNA}_3$ index and the $\text{PNA}_4$ index is small.

Applying rotated principal component analysis to the 500-hPa geopotential height anomaly field in the Northern Hemisphere can also provide a quantification of the PNA ($\text{PNA}_\text{RPCA}$), with the canonical PNA pattern emerging as the second-leading principal component. This methodology is used by the U.S. Climate Prediction Center to compute its PNA index.

== Dynamics ==
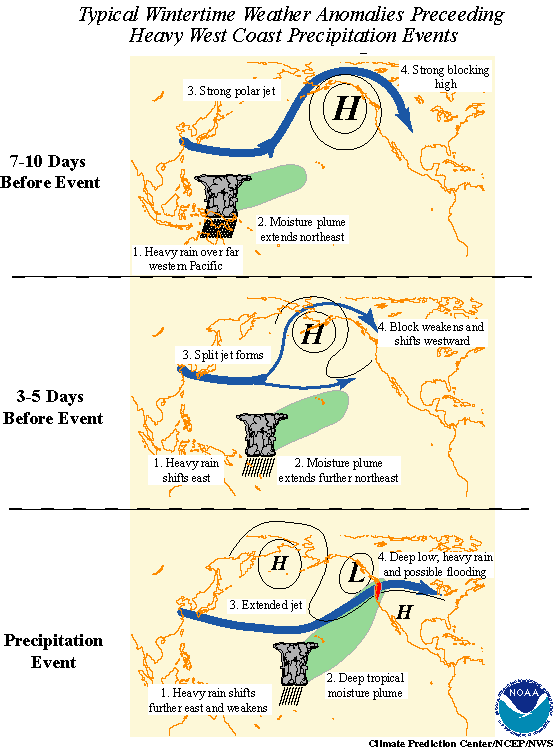
Convection over the tropical Pacific and Indian oceans can impact the jet stream over the North Pacific

Although the PNA is usually defined based on anomalies relative to monthly or seasonal averages, the PNA often varies at weekly timescales. However, as a pattern of internal climate variability, the state of the PNA occasionally changes without a clear and identifiable cause. This reduces the predictability of the PNA and can complicate long-range seasonal weather forecasts. Predictability of the PNA is limited to roughly within 10 days. The PNA is associated with changes in the intensity and positioning of the East Asian jet stream. During the positive phase of the PNA, the East Asian jet intensifies and extends eastward across the North Pacific towards the western U.S. During the negative phase, the jet stream is retracted over East Asia, producing a blocking weather pattern over the North Pacific. Some of the energy that drives the PNA originates from the barotropic instability produced by the jet, potentially exciting Rossby waves. Shifts in the jet stream can induce changes in air pressure distributions both near and downstream of the jet.

Storms over the tropical Pacific and Indian oceans may play a role in exciting the positive and negative phases of the PNA by influencing the East Asian jet. Tropical convection can induce a low-amplitude PNA pattern that amplifies to its peak strength after 8–12 days. Atmospheric eddies and Rossby waves can further intensify the PNA pattern. Positive PNA is correlated with increased convective activity over western tropical Pacific and reduced convective activity over the tropical Indian Ocean, while negative PNA is correlated with the opposite convective anomalies. The Rossby waves associated with positive PNA tend to track eastward and undergo cyclonic wavebreaking, while those associated with negative PNA tend to track equatorward towards the subtropics and break anticyclonically; the wavebreaking behavior of the Rossby waves is determined by the meridional gradient of potential vorticity and the magnitude and orientation of wind shear, which in turn are modulated by variations in the East Asian jet stream. In either case, positive feedbacks associated with the wavebreaking sustain amplified PNA patterns.

Other teleconnections can modulate the PNA by modifying the jet stream. The El Niño–Southern Oscillation (ENSO) impacts the behavior of PNA, with the positive phase of the PNA more commonly associated with El Niño and the negative phase more commonly associated with La Niña. This relationship is most evident at seasonal timescales, making the seasonal PNA more predictable than the monthly PNA. The negative phase is also favored when the Madden–Julian oscillation (MJO) enhances convection over the Indian Ocean and Maritime Continent; the positive phase is favored when the MJO enhances convection closer to the central Pacific. The MJO's influence on the PNA arises from the interaction between the enhanced convection and the Pacific jet stream.

== Effects on weather ==
The regional variations in weather associated with the PNA are generally the result of the PNA's influence on the East Asian jet. The temperature pattern associated with the PNA follows the pattern of anomalous ridging and troughing. The positive phase of the PNA is correlated with above-average temperatures over the U.S. Pacific Coast and Western Canada. During the positive phase, an anomalously strong ridge of high pressure over Canada reduces the frequency of cold air outbreaks over western Northern America. Below-average temperatures over the South-Central U.S., Southeastern U.S., and U.S. East Coast are associated with the positive phase due to the presence of anomalously low pressure. The influence of the PNA on surface temperatures over North America is reduced during the summer.

Correlations between precipitation patterns and the PNA are weaker than temperature patterns, but are nonetheless evident. Anomalously high precipitation over the Gulf of Alaska and Pacific Northwest accompany the positive phase, along with below-average precipitation totals over the Pacific Northwest, Northern Rocky Mountains, and Ohio and Tennessee river valleys. The negative PNA phase exhibits the opposite departures from average.

== See also ==
- Teleconnection
- Arctic dipole anomaly
- Kuroshio Current
- North Pacific Gyre
- Pacific Decadal Oscillation
- Pineapple Express
- Walker circulation
