= North Atlantic oscillation =

Weather phenomenon over the Atlantic Ocean

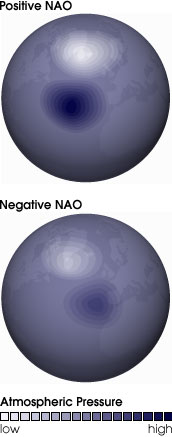

The North Atlantic Oscillation (NAO) is a weather phenomenon over the North Atlantic Ocean of fluctuations in the difference of atmospheric pressure at sea level (SLP) between the Icelandic Low and the Azores High. Through fluctuations in the strength of the Icelandic Low and the Azores High, it controls the strength and direction of westerly winds and location of storm tracks across the North Atlantic.

The NAO was discovered through several studies in the late 19th and early 20th centuries. Unlike the El Niño–Southern Oscillation phenomenon in the Pacific Ocean, the NAO is a largely atmospheric mode. It is one of the most important manifestations of climate fluctuations in the North Atlantic and surrounding humid climates.

The North Atlantic Oscillation is closely related to the Arctic oscillation (AO) (or Northern Annular Mode (NAM)), but should not be confused with the Atlantic multidecadal oscillation (AMO).

== Definition ==
The NAO has multiple possible definitions. The easiest to understand are those based on measuring the seasonal average air pressure difference between stations, such as:

- Lisbon and Stykkishólmur/Reykjavík
- Ponta Delgada, Azores and Stykkishólmur/Reykjavík
- Azores (1865–2002), Gibraltar (1821–2007), and Reykjavík

These definitions all have in common the same northern point (because this is the only station in the region with a long record) in Iceland; and various southern points. All are attempting to capture the same pattern of variation, by choosing stations in the "eye" of the two stable pressure areas, the Azores High and the Icelandic Low (shown in the graphic).

A more complex definition, only possible with more complete modern records generated by numerical weather prediction, is based on the principal empirical orthogonal function (EOF) of surface pressure. This definition has a high degree of correlation with the station-based definition. This then leads onto a debate as to whether the NAO is distinct from the AO/NAM, and if not, which of the two is to be considered the most physically based expression of atmospheric structure (as opposed to the one that most clearly falls out of mathematical expression).

== Description ==
Winter index of the NAO based on the difference of normalized sea level pressure (SLP) between Gibraltar and Iceland since 1823, with a loess smoothing (black)

Westerly winds blowing across the Atlantic bring moist air into Europe. In years when westerlies are strong, summers are cool, winters are mild and rain is frequent. If westerlies are suppressed, the temperature is more extreme in summer and winter leading to heat waves, deep freezes and reduced rainfall.

A permanent low-pressure system over Iceland (the Icelandic Low) and a permanent high-pressure system over the Azores (the Azores High) control the direction and strength of westerly winds into Europe. The relative strengths and positions of these systems vary from year to year and this variation is known as the NAO. A large difference in the pressure at the two stations (a high index year, denoted NAO+) leads to increased westerlies and, consequently, cool summers and mild and wet winters in Central Europe and its Atlantic facade. In contrast, if the index is low (NAO-), westerlies are suppressed, northern European areas suffer cold dry winters and storms track southwards toward the Mediterranean Sea. This brings increased storm activity and rainfall to southern Europe and North Africa.

Especially during the months of November to April, the NAO is responsible for much of the variability of weather in the North Atlantic region, affecting wind speed and wind direction changes, changes in temperature and moisture distribution and the intensity, number and track of storms. Research now suggests that the NAO may be more predictable than previously assumed and skillful winter forecasts may be possible for the NAO.

There is some debate as to how much the NAO impacts short term weather over North America. While most agree that the impact of the NAO is much less over the United States than for Western Europe, the NAO is also believed to affect the weather over much of upper central and eastern areas of North America. During the winter, when the index is high (NAO+), the Azores High draws a stronger south-westerly circulation over the eastern half of the North American continent which prevents Arctic air from plunging southward (into the United States south of 40° latitude). In combination with the El Niño, this effect can produce significantly warmer winters over the upper Midwest and New England, but the impact to the south of these areas is debatable. Conversely, when the NAO index is low (NAO-), the upper central and northeastern portions of the United States can incur winter cold outbreaks more than the norm with associated heavy snowstorms. In summer, a strong NAO- is thought to contribute to a weakened jet stream that normally pulls zonal systems into the Atlantic Basin contributing significantly to excessively long-lasting heat waves over Europe, however, recent studies do not show the evidence of these associations.

More recent studies have shown that the components (pressure centers strength, and locations) of the NAO are more powerful to investigate the relationships to seasonal and sub-seasonal climate variability over Europe, North America and the Mediterranean region.

== Effects on North Atlantic sea level ==
Under a positive NAO index (NAO+), regional reduction in atmospheric pressure results in a regional rise in sea level due to the 'inverse barometer effect'. This effect is important to both the interpretation of historic sea level records and predictions of future sea level trends, as mean pressure fluctuations of the order of millibars can lead to sea level fluctuations of the order of centimeters.

== North Atlantic hurricanes ==
By controlling the position of the Azores High, the NAO also influences the direction of general storm paths for major North Atlantic tropical cyclones: a position of the Azores High farther to the south tends to force storms into the Gulf of Mexico, whereas a northern position allows them to track up the North American Atlantic Coast.

As paleotempestological research has shown, few major hurricanes struck the Gulf coast during 3000–1400 BC and again during the most recent millennium. These quiescent intervals were separated by a hyperactive period during 1400 BC – AD 1000, when the Gulf coast was struck frequently by catastrophic hurricanes and their landfall probabilities increased by 3–5 times.

== Ecological effects ==
Until recently, the NAO had been in an overall more positive regime since the late 1970s, bringing colder conditions to the North-West Atlantic, which has been linked with the thriving populations of Labrador Sea snow crabs, which have a low temperature optimum.

The NAO+ warming of the North Sea reduces survival of cod larvae which are at the upper limits of their temperature tolerance, as does the cooling in the Labrador Sea, where the cod larvae are at their lower temperature limits. Though not the critical factor, the NAO+ peak in the early 1990s may have contributed to the collapse of the Newfoundland cod fishery.

In southwestern Europe, NAO- events are associated with increased winds.

On the East Coast of the United States an NAO+ causes warmer temperatures and increased rainfall, and thus warmer, less saline surface water. This prevents nutrient-rich upwelling which has reduced productivity. Georges Bank and the Gulf of Maine are affected by this reduced cod catch.

The strength of the NAO is also a determinant in the population fluctuations of the intensively studied Soay sheep.

Strangely enough, Jonas and Joern (2007) found a strong signal between NAO and grasshopper species composition in the tall grass prairies of the midwestern United States. They found that, even though NAO does not significantly affect the weather in the midwest, there was a significant increase in abundance of common grasshopper species (i.e. Hypochlora alba, Hesperotettix spp., Phoetaliotes nebrascensis, M. scudderi, M. keeleri, and Pseudopomala brachyptera) following winters during the positive phase of NAO and a significant increase in the abundance of less common species (i.e. Campylacantha olivacea, Melanoplus sanguinipes, Mermiria picta, Melanoplus packardii, and Boopedon gracile) following winters during a negative phase of the NAO. This is thought to be the first study showing a link between NAO and terrestrial insects in North America.

The NAO's ecological effects extend as far as the Tibetan Plateau, where increases in aridity resulting in significant forest mortality and intensification of dust storms have been linked to NAO- events.

== Winter of 2009–10 in Europe ==
The winter of 2009–10 in Europe was unusually cold. It is hypothesized that this may be due to a combination of low solar activity, a Modoki or a Central Pacific (CP) El Niño event which often associated a "wavier" jet stream that induces a negative NAO phase (pressure differences between the Icelandic Low and Azores High are reduced) and a strong easterly phase of the Quasi-Biennial Oscillation all occurring simultaneously. The Met Office reported that the UK, for example, had experienced its coldest winter for 30 years. This coincided with an exceptionally negative phase of the NAO. Analysis published in mid-2010 confirmed that the concurrent 'El Niño' event and the rare occurrence of an extremely negative NAO were involved.

However, during the winter of 2010–11 in Northern and Western Europe, the Icelandic Low, typically positioned west of Iceland and east of Greenland, appeared regularly to the east of Iceland and so allowed exceptionally cold air into Europe from the Arctic. A strong area of high pressure was initially situated over Greenland, reversing the normal wind pattern in the northwestern Atlantic, creating a blocking pattern driving warm air into northeastern Canada and cold air into Western Europe, as was the case during the previous winter. This occurred during a La Niña season and it was an Eastern Pacific (EP) La Niña event which are often associated with a negative North Atlantic Oscillation (NAO), promoting cold, wet conditions in southern Europe and the eastern U.S., and is connected to the rare Arctic dipole anomaly.

In the north western part of the Atlantic, both of these winters were mild, especially 2009–2010, which was the warmest recorded in Canada. The winter of 2010-2011 was particularly above normal in the northern Arctic regions of that country.

The probability of cold winters with much snow in Central Europe rises when the Arctic is covered by less sea ice in summer. Scientists of the Potsdam Research Unit of the Alfred Wegener Institute for Polar and Marine Research in the Helmholtz Association have decrypted a mechanism in which a shrinking summertime sea ice cover changes the air pressure zones in the Arctic atmosphere and effects on European winter weather.

If there is a particularly large-scale melt of Arctic sea ice in summer, as observed in recent years, two important effects are intensified. Firstly, the retreat of the light ice surface reveals the darker ocean, causing it to warm up more in summer from the solar radiation (ice–albedo feedback mechanism). Secondly, the diminished ice cover can no longer prevent the heat stored in the ocean being released into the atmosphere (lid effect). As a result of the decreased sea ice cover the air is warmed more greatly than it used to be particularly in autumn and winter because during this period the ocean is warmer than the atmosphere.

The warming of the air near to the ground leads to rising movements and the atmosphere becomes less stable. One of these patterns is the air pressure difference between the Arctic and mid-latitudes: the Arctic oscillation with the Azores highs and Iceland lows known from the weather reports. If this difference is high, a strong westerly wind will result which in winter carries warm and humid Atlantic air masses right down to Europe. In the negative phase when pressure differences are low, cold Arctic air can then easily penetrate southward through Europe without being interrupted by the usual westerlies. Model calculations show that the air pressure difference with decreased sea ice cover in the Arctic summer is weakened in the following winter, enabling Arctic cold to push down to mid-latitudes.

== Winter of 2015–16 in Europe ==
Despite one of the strongest El Niño events recorded in the Pacific Ocean, a largely positive North Atlantic Oscillation prevailed over Europe during the winter of 2015–2016 due to a Canonical or an Eastern Pacific (EP) El Niño event which have an opposing effect on the North Atlantic Oscillation (NAO) and the Arctic Oscillation (AO) and tend to favor a positive NAO, bringing stronger westerly winds and milder conditions. For example, Cumbria in England registered one of the wettest months on record. The Maltese Islands in the Mediterranean registered one of the driest years ever recorded up to beginning of March, with a national average of only 235 mm and some areas registering less than 200 mm.

== See also ==
- Arctic oscillation
- Antarctic oscillation
- Anticyclone
- Atlantic Ocean
- Azores High
- El Niño–Southern Oscillation
- Global warming
- Icelandic Low
- Latitude of the Gulf Stream and the Gulf Stream north wall index
- North Atlantic Current
- North Atlantic Gyre
- Pacific decadal oscillation
- Pacific–North American teleconnection pattern
- Quasi-biennial oscillation
