= North American High =

The North American High (also Canadian High/Anticyclone, sometimes in Europe Greenland High/Anticyclone) is an impermanent high-pressure area or anticyclone created by a formative process that occurs when cool or cold dry air settles over North America. During summer, it is replaced with an Arctic Low, or a North American Low should it move over continental land.

== Description ==
A North American High moves eastward across the continent, often in the company of one or more low-pressure cells or cyclones. The cold, dense air does not extend usually above 3 km (1.9 mi) and is lower than the Canadian Rockies mountain range. Occasionally during winter, a North American High passes over the Rockies resulting in a cold front into Southwestern United States and Mexico, freezing crops and producing snow into Mexico's mountains, as far south as Jalisco. The North American High's distance from the warm Pacific Ocean as well as its protection from the Rockies to its West reinforces its intensity. The average January sea level pressure at its centre is approximately 1,020 millibars (30.12 inches of mercury). The Canadian high often moves south-eastward until it reaches the Atlantic Ocean, where it merges with the Azores High. During summer, the Canadian high circulates cool, dry air to the United States located east of the Rockies and parts of southern Canada.

The North American High is akin to the Siberian High of Eurasia, though much smaller, and has much less influence, merely affecting the weather of the Northern Hemisphere. The sea-level pressure (atmospheric pressure) rarely, if ever, exceeds 1055 millibars (1055 hectopascals)(hPa)(SI).

Often, in the winter months, cool or cold dry air settles over the land in the vicinity of the Great Basin where it builds into a high-pressure cell or anticyclone that moves across the United States with a cold front on its leading edge. After reaching the Atlantic Ocean, the moist environment results in a change of air quality and the dissipation of the high-pressure cell or anticyclone as the cold air warms and becomes humid. In Europe, a portion of the North American/Canadian High commonly over Greenland, called the Greenland High, affects northern European weather and may merge with the Scandinavian High.

== See also ==
- Siberian High
- Cold wave
