= Latitude of the Gulf Stream and the Gulf Stream north wall index =

The Gulf Stream separates from the US coast near Cape Hatteras (35°N, 75°W) and then travels eastwards across the North Atlantic, becoming the North Atlantic current at about 55°W. In the region between 75°W and 55°W it is subject to meanders and is frequently accompanied by eddies. The northern edge of the current is marked by a sharp fall in temperature. This is also the case at much greater depths, so that the warm current is pressed up against a wall of cold water, called the 'north wall'. Monthly charts of the path of the north wall of the Gulf Stream have been available from surface, aircraft and satellite observations since 1966 and these have been used in several studies of the path's variability.

== History ==
In 1980, Taylor and Stephens constructed a measure of the latitude of the current, the Gulf Stream north wall (GSNW) index by extracting and analysing time-series of the latitude at six longitudes between 79°W and 65°W, a series of data that continues to the present day. There have been other subsequent studies. In 1994, Drinkwater et al. examined the latitude of the north wall from the 1970s to 1992 at each degree of longitude from 50 to 75°W, and Miller analysed the onshore/offshore position of the north wall at 10 cross-isobath transects equally spaced between 75 and 80°W from 1976 to 1988. Gangopadhyay et al. have derived a ten-year time series of the latitude of the separation of the Gulf Stream from the 1970s to the 1980s. By applying empirical orthogonal function analysis to temperatures at 200 metres, Joyce et al. in 2001 constructed a similar index to the GSNW index extending back to the 1950s.

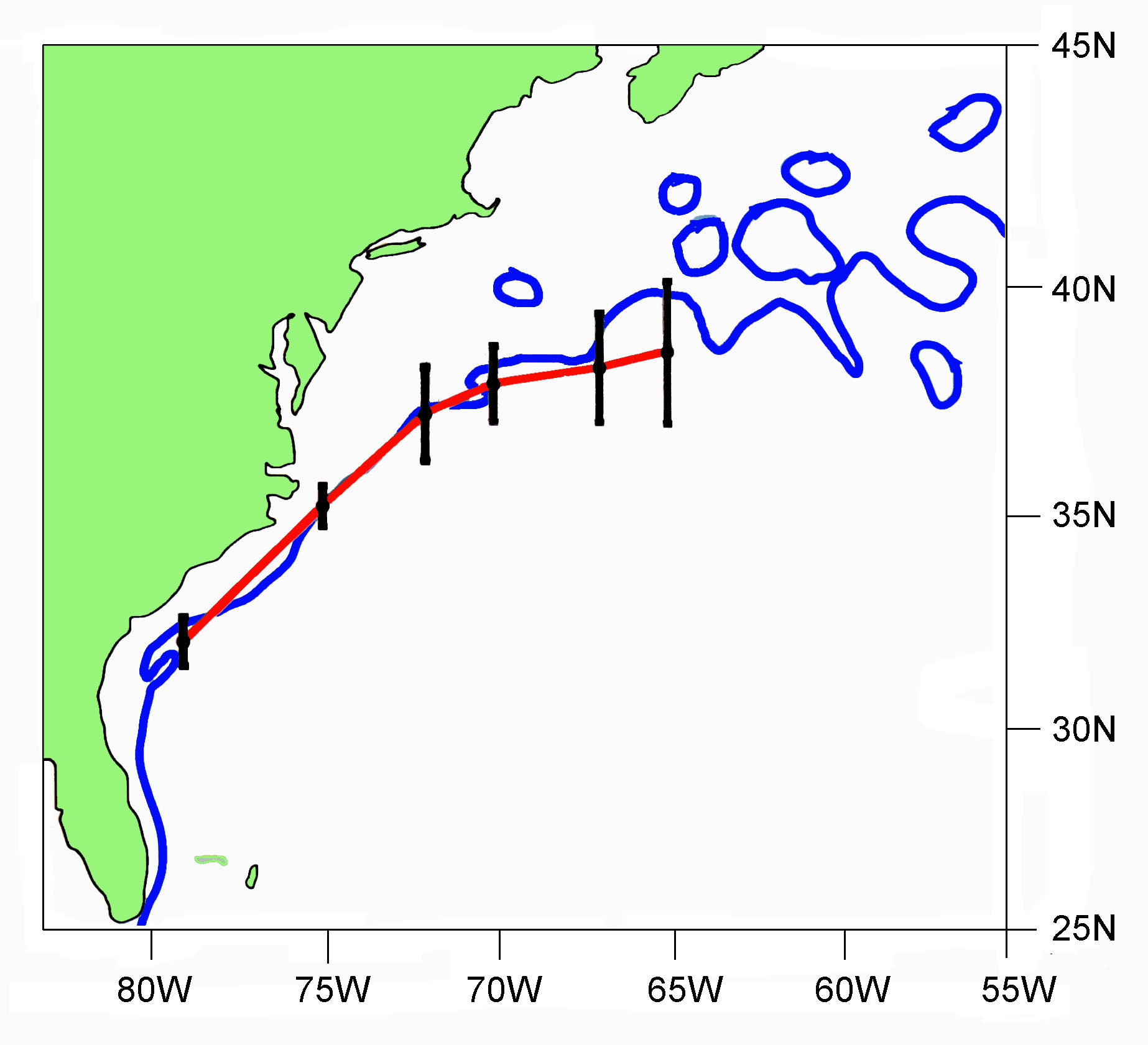
North Wall with standard deviations.

== Construction ==
Monthly charts of the Gulf Stream have been published by the US Naval Oceanographic in "Gulf Stream Monthly Summary" from 1966 to 1974, and by the US National Oceanic and Atmospheric Administration in "Gulf Stream" from 1975 to 1980 and "Oceanographic Monthly Summary" from 1981 until 1994. Later charts have been obtained from the US Navy. Each chart gives a snap-shot of the currents path at the end of the month. The monthly charts were analysed by the procedure described in Taylor.

The latitude of the north wall was read from each chart at each of the six longitudes: 79, 75, 72, 70, 67 and 65°W. Principal components analysis was then used to find the pattern of variation common to the six longitudes. This is preferable to simple averaging of the six latitude estimates which would emphasise the eastern longitudes where the north-south movements are largest, and possibly obscure smaller but coherent north-south shifts further west. Correlation coefficients are calculated between the six time-series and the principal components are the eigenvectors of the resulting correlation matrix. (Empirical orthogonal function analysis proceeds instead from the variance-covariance matrix which again is biased to the eastern longitudes.)

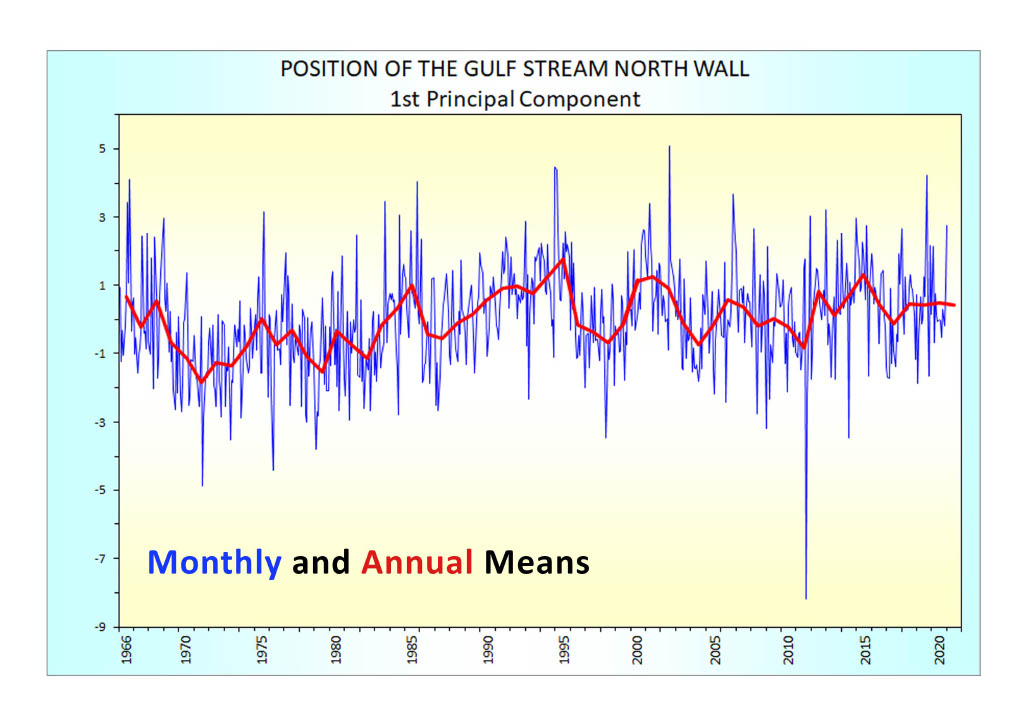
The Gulf Stream North Wall index.

Each principal component is calculated as a weighted average of the standardised latitude series using weightings that can be expressed as correlation coefficients between the components and the original series. The first principal component of the position of the north wall has positive correlation coefficients of about 0.5 with the latitude of the north wall at each of the six longitudes from 79°W to 65°W, respectively, and therefore represents displacements of this whole section of the Gulf Stream. Seasonal changes in the position are relatively small and so this principal component is virtually indistinguishable from that obtained if the annual cycle is removed beforehand.

Because each monthly chart gives the path of the current on one particular day, the monthly positions are strongly influenced by short period meandering of the Stream. Only annual values of the index which average out this variability can be meaningfully used to look at long-term changes.

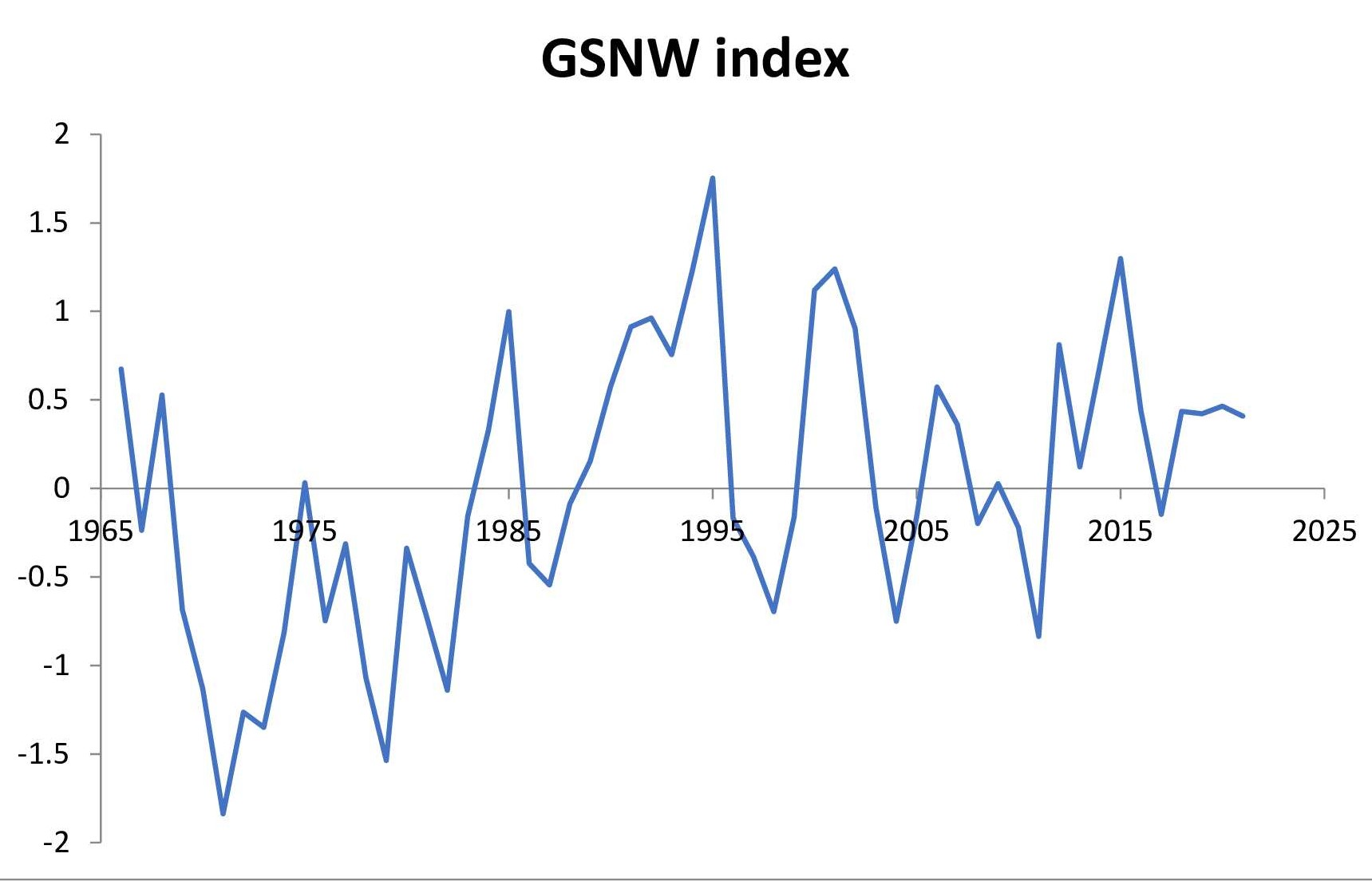
Annual values of the index.

== Interpretation ==
Curry et al. have used the potential energy anomaly difference between the Labrador Sea and Bermuda as a measure of the transport of the Gulf Stream system. Curry and McCartney have pointed out their index correlates well with the latitude of the north wall. The GSNW index is therefore a measure of changes in the large-scale ocean currents.

The latitude of the north wall in any year, as described in the GSNW index, is a delayed response to atmospheric changes over the North Atlantic Ocean, and especially to the North Atlantic Oscillation (NAO). Gangopadhyay et al. found that the point of separation of the Gulf Stream from the US coast was determined by the wind patterns across the ocean two or three years earlier, which they attributed to the passage of Rossby waves across the ocean. The GSNW index has been observed to follow the North Atlantic Oscillation with a lag of two years which is in agreement with (but Joyce et al. reported a shorter delay). Hameed and Piontkovski have shown the index seems to be most sensitive to the Iceland Low. Taylor and Gangopadhyay have used a simple model developed by Behringer, Regier and Stommel to predict the latitude of the Gulf Stream on the basis of the NAO (see Fig. 1). This model has also been tested using data from a coupled ocean-atmosphere model. The latitude of the Gulf Stream is also affected by the El Nino-Southern Oscillation in the equatorial Pacific Ocean. Silver et al. have combined wind-forcing and buoyancy in a forecast scheme.

== Teleconnections across the North Atlantic ==
The latitude of the north wall has been linked via the atmospheric circulation with a variety of changes at the other side of the North Atlantic Ocean. The Continuous Plankton Recorder Survey, now run by the Sir Alister Hardy Foundation for Ocean Science in Plymouth, UK, has monitored the plankton in the surface waters of the North Sea and NE Atlantic for more than half a century. Over most of this time many of the zooplankton in these regions have gone up and down in abundance as the Gulf Stream has shifted north or south, and, a relationship that has been seen most clearly in the abundance of copepods. The link with the current has also been reported in the zooplankton off the Northumberland coast of the UK studied by the Dove Marine Laboratory of Newcastle University. Interactions between the individual constituents of the ecosystem appear to have been bringing out a signal weakly expressed throughout the meteorological variables. This process which has been reproduced using an ecosystem model. Further afield, the GSNW index has been used to forecast temperatures in the Barents Sea.

This effect has also been seen in non-marine ecosystems. The numbers of Daphnia in two lakes of the English Lake District, Windermere and Esthwaite Water, have observed to go down when the Gulf Stream is northward (and up when it is southward). This is the reverse of the marine relationship, a difference that can be attributed to the influence of the timing and intensity of thermal lake stratification on the seasonal dynamics of the zooplankton. The relationship of thermal stratification to the GSNW index has been replicated in a model. Jennings and Allott have reported a positive relationship between winter nitrate concentrations in two lakes in SW Ireland and the latitudinal position of the Gulf Stream in the previous spring. The long-distance association with the position of the Gulf Stream has also been reported in a long-running series of observations of wild plants along a roadside in the English Cotswolds.

== Index data ==
The table below lists index data for the Gulf Stream north wall:

Year	Jan	Feb	Mar	Apr	May	Jun	Jul	Aug	Sep	Oct	Nov	Dec	Ann
1966	0.95	-1.24	-0.30	-1.05	-0.21	0.73	3.43	1.02	4.08	-0.35	0.43	0.60	0.67
1967	-1.05	-0.53	-1.64	-1.02	-0.84	-0.36	2.39	-0.42	-0.33	-0.88	2.51	-0.66	-0.24
1968	-1.01	1.78	-0.18	-2.07	2.39	0.66	-1.75	-1.11	0.69	1.39	2.52	3.03	0.53
1969	0.56	0.25	1.03	-1.00	0.22	-1.25	-0.79	-2.12	-2.66	-0.38	-2.18	0.10	-0.68
1970	-2.25	-2.71	-1.89	-0.11	0.01	1.38	-0.37	-2.49	-2.24	-1.17	-1.24	-0.47	-1.13
1971	-1.18	-1.71	-1.84	-2.59	-1.43	0.05	-4.90	-2.90	-1.66	-1.54	-1.67	-0.67	-1.84
1972	-0.26	-1.43	-0.15	-1.96	-2.06	-2.55	0.14	-1.81	-2.04	-2.85	-0.04	-0.15	-1.26
1973	-2.56	-1.38	-1.51	-0.79	-3.53	-1.81	-1.85	-0.83	-0.16	-0.82	-0.30	-0.63	-1.35
1974	0.55	-2.90	-1.41	-0.16	-0.47	-1.13	-1.55	-1.37	0.35	-0.31	-1.14	-0.22	-0.81
1975	0.13	-0.90	0.61	1.23	-1.56	-1.58	1.73	3.20	0.08	-0.37	-2.30	0.11	0.03
1976	-0.02	-2.28	-4.46	-0.53	-0.09	0.24	-0.88	-0.84	-1.32	0.70	-0.07	0.57	-0.75
1977	1.92	-0.73	1.27	0.74	-2.53	0.43	-1.10	-1.27	-0.55	-0.72	-1.05	-0.18	-0.31
1978	-0.41	-2.59	0.28	0.00	-2.83	-3.00	0.05	-1.66	-0.28	-0.10	-0.83	-1.50	-1.07
1979	-3.82	-2.72	-2.89	-1.38	-1.19	0.54	-0.41	-1.92	-0.20	-2.11	-2.11	-0.23	-1.54
1980	-1.39	1.15	1.36	-1.33	-0.30	-1.99	0.82	-2.70	0.62	1.84	-0.41	-1.73	-0.34
1981	-2.24	0.23	-1.18	-2.95	-0.08	-0.99	0.00	-0.40	-0.25	2.46	-1.64	-1.75	-0.73
1982	0.57	-1.83	-0.95	-2.60	-1.20	-1.37	-1.48	-0.57	-2.69	-0.07	0.21	-1.68	-1.14
1983	-0.96	-1.82	0.11	-0.59	-1.45	-1.04	-0.71	3.46	0.68	-0.72	0.41	0.73	-0.16
1984	0.56	0.78	0.51	0.54	-0.95	-1.50	-2.82	3.08	-0.47	1.33	1.62	1.28	0.33
1985	1.24	0.33	-0.55	1.24	2.64	0.76	0.75	0.35	1.11	4.06	0.19	-0.13	1.00
1986	2.32	-1.87	-1.76	-1.35	-1.31	-0.09	-0.55	-1.87	-0.75	1.19	1.22	-0.28	-0.42
1987	-2.51	-1.29	-2.69	-1.64	-0.57	-0.13	0.42	0.61	1.34	0.77	0.22	-1.06	-0.54
1988	-1.34	1.40	-0.04	-0.34	-0.88	-1.24	0.23	-0.45	1.72	0.29	0.06	-0.48	-0.09
1989	-1.35	0.03	0.25	0.76	0.99	0.21	-0.59	-1.60	0.01	0.51	0.68	1.94	0.15
1990	1.58	1.35	0.17	0.58	0.53	-1.09	-0.27	0.97	0.80	0.64	1.24	0.40	0.58
1991	-0.22	-0.30	-0.63	0.22	1.31	1.97	1.34	1.47	2.43	1.88	0.31	1.18	0.91
1992	1.84	0.70	1.31	0.72	0.88	0.00	0.72	0.46	0.84	0.55	0.67	2.86	0.96
1993	-0.78	1.26	-2.36	0.13	1.21	1.05	-0.14	1.86	1.70	1.97	2.08	1.08	0.75
1994	2.21	1.99	1.71	0.85	0.72	2.17	1.20	0.77	-0.18	-0.03	-1.11	4.47	1.23
1995	4.38	2.56	1.41	0.55	0.52	2.22	1.17	2.58	1.94	2.21	1.83	-0.32	1.75
1996	2.25	0.30	1.63	-0.51	-1.15	-1.14	-0.48	-1.05	0.78	0.23	-0.92	-1.99	-0.17
1997	-0.48	-0.40	-1.42	-0.39	0.66	-0.68	0.92	-0.64	-0.60	-0.60	-1.20	0.23	-0.39
1998	0.84	-0.12	0.04	-3.49	-2.22	-0.70	-1.19	-0.92	0.99	0.58	-1.93	-0.21	-0.69
1999	-0.47	-0.39	-0.97	-0.92	0.71	0.43	-1.76	-0.37	-0.76	1.97	0.27	0.32	-0.16
2000	-0.18	1.03	2.03	-0.33	0.04	0.36	0.80	0.31	2.20	2.68	2.62	1.86	1.12
2001	1.56	1.20	3.40	2.12	1.65	-0.38	0.47	0.67	1.46	-0.42	1.63	1.52	1.24
2002	0.10	0.68	0.46	-0.09	0.01	-0.88	5.09	1.70	1.56	1.20	0.89	0.09	0.90
2003	0.55	-0.02	1.78	0.09	-1.43	-1.48	1.16	-1.16	-0.23	-0.63	-0.57	0.65	-0.11
2004	-1.57	-0.86	-1.44	-1.46	-1.35	-1.83	-1.44	-0.26	-1.43	0.75	0.13	1.75	-0.75
2005	0.81	0.20	-1.00	0.03	0.75	-1.50	-2.18	-0.63	0.24	0.85	0.42	0.08	-0.16
2006	-0.49	-0.53	1.63	-2.41	-0.66	-0.01	-0.23	0.29	1.39	3.65	2.33	1.93	0.57
2007	0.39	-0.37	0.83	0.93	0.47	1.00	-0.66	0.14	0.75	0.51	0.52	-0.19	0.36
2008	-0.81	2.67	0.90	-0.74	-2.79	-0.41	1.31	-0.98	-0.20	1.15	0.69	-3.18	-0.20
2009	2.10	-0.49	-2.34	-0.78	-1.26	-0.07	-0.21	0.45	1.35	0.83	0.36	0.40	0.03
2010	0.52	1.12	-1.30	-0.44	-2.15	0.42	0.67	0.92	-0.59	-0.79	-0.07	-0.96	-0.22
2011	-1.12	-0.44	-0.39	-1.49	-0.69	1.47	1.75	-8.37	-2.30	0.27	3.04	-1.76	-0.83
2012	-0.97	0.47	1.09	1.50	1.44	1.06	0.50	-0.01	0.46	0.86	0.12	3.22	0.81
2013	-0.72	-0.14	-0.56	-1.74	-0.45	0.65	-1.76	0.93	2.29	0.22	0.15	2.59	0.12
2014	1.18	0.32	0.46	1.65	1.08	-3.46	1.12	0.41	0.93	0.50	1.24	3.03	0.70
2015	2.32	1.66	0.85	0.92	2.26	1.99	0.59	2.77	1.04	-1.68	0.94	1.92	1.30
2016	1.44	0.44	0.94	0.61	0.58	-0.70	0.66	1.35	1.45	0.05	-0.17	-1.39	0.44
2017	-1.71	-1.75	0.89	-1.29	0.00	-0.94	-1.40	-0.44	-0.66	1.87	1.03	2.66	-0.15
2018	0.30	-0.44	1.23	0.22	0.27	0.92	1.31	0.94	0.85	0.11	-1.21	0.70	0.44
2019	-1.87	-0.56	0.67	-0.14	0.06	1.24	0.66	4.22	0.18	-1.65	2.14	0.12	0.42
2020	2.11	-0.69	0.74	0.16	-0.05	-0.02	-0.04	-0.54	0.32	-0.19	1.01	2.79	0.46
2021	1.81	0.40	-1.21	-2.17	-1.54	2.69	-0.36	0.15	1.27	1.27	0.71	1.90	0.41
