= Icelandic Low =

Low air pressure area in the Atlantic Ocean

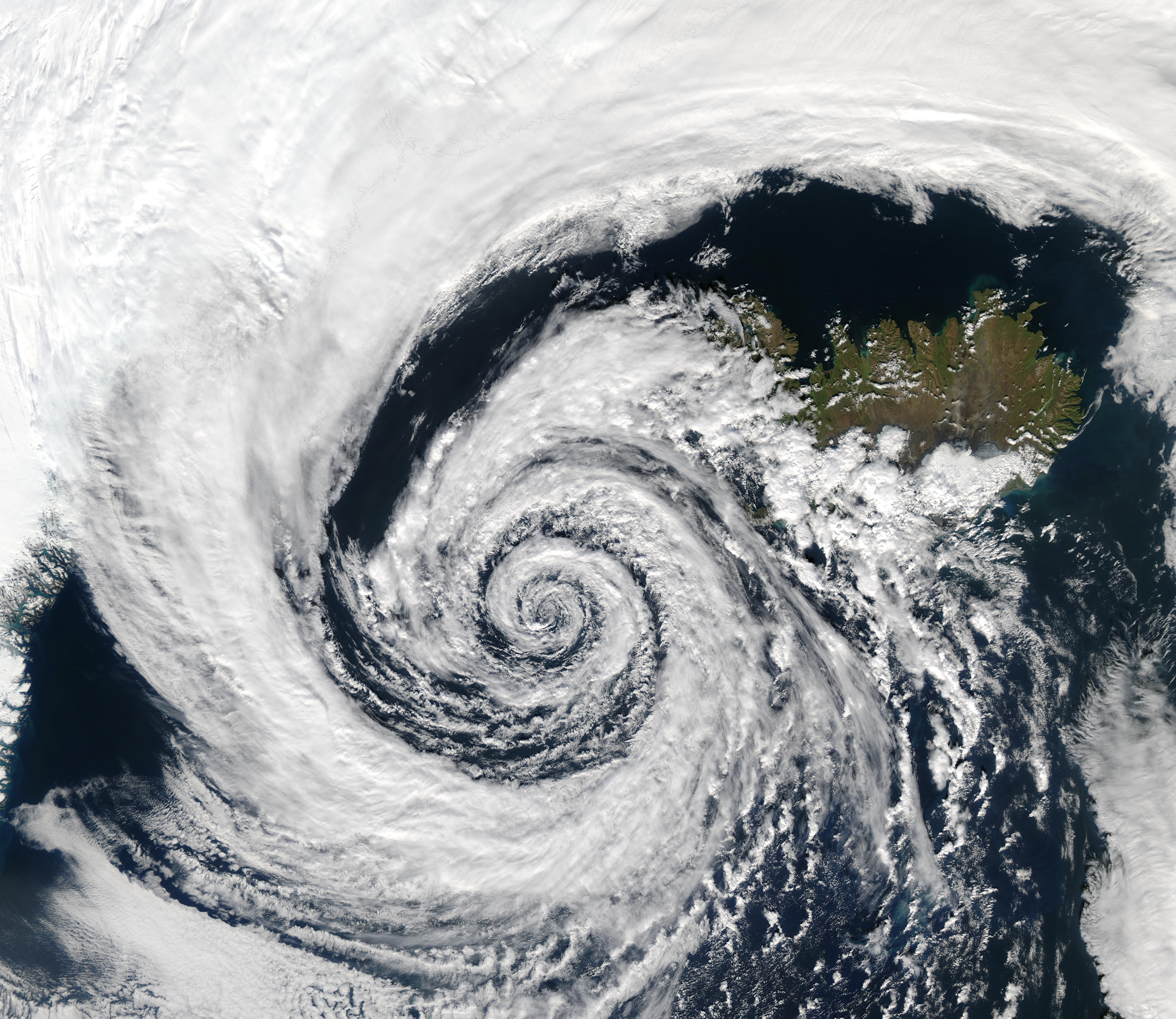
An Icelandic cyclone on September 4, 2003

The Icelandic Low is a semi-permanent centre of low atmospheric pressure found between Iceland and southern Greenland, extending into the Barents Sea during Northern Hemisphere winter. In the summer, it weakens and splits into two centres, one near Davis Strait, Labrador; and the other west of Iceland. It is a principal centre of action in the atmosphere circulation of the Northern Hemisphere, associated with frequent cyclone activity. It forms one pole of the North Atlantic oscillation, the other being the Azores High.

== See also ==
- Kona low
- Aleutian low
