= Siberian High =

High pressure mass of cold dry air over northeastern Eurasia

Coordinates: 66°53′N 93°28′E

- Area of occurrence: Northeastern part of Eurasia
- Season: September–April
- Effect: Severe winter cold and attendant dry conditions with little snow and few or no glaciers

The Siberian High (also Siberian Anticyclone; Russian: Азиатский антициклон (Aziatsky antitsiklon); Chinese: 西伯利亞高壓; Pinyin Xībólìyǎ gāoyā; Kazakh Азия антициклоны (Aziya antitsiklonı)) is a massive collection of cold dry air that accumulates in the northeastern part of Eurasia from September until April. It is usually centered on Lake Baikal. It reaches its greatest size and strength in the winter when the air temperature near the center of the high-pressure area is often lower than −40 °C (−40 °F). The atmospheric pressure is often above 1,040 millibars (31 inHg). The Siberian High is the strongest semi-permanent high in the northern hemisphere and is responsible for both the lowest temperature in the Northern Hemisphere outside Greenland, of −67.8 °C (−90.0 °F) on 15 January 1885 at Verkhoyansk, and the highest pressure, 1083.8 mbar (108.38 kPa, 32.01 inHg) at Agata, Krasnoyarsk Krai, on 31 December 1968, ever recorded. The Siberian High is responsible both for severe winter cold and attendant dry conditions with little snow and few or no glaciers across the Asian part of Russia, Mongolia, and China. During the summer, the Siberian High is largely replaced by the Asiatic low.

== Overview ==
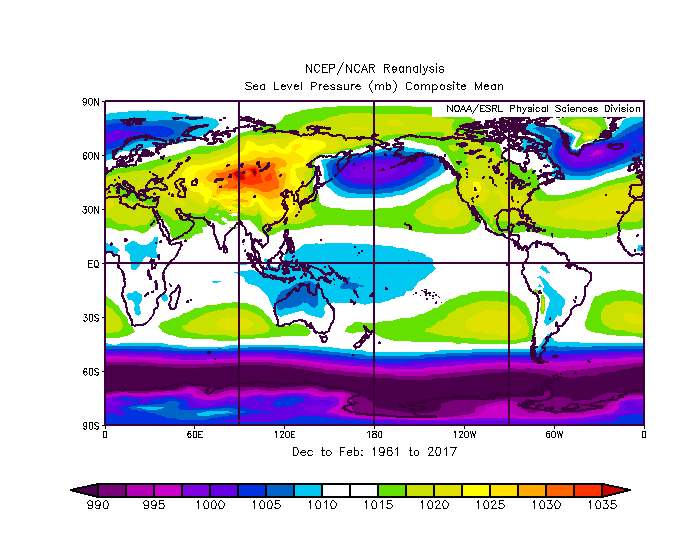
The plot of mean sea level pressure over the winter months shows a large area of high atmospheric pressure in the South of Siberia.

The Siberian High affects the weather patterns in most parts of the Northern Hemisphere: its influence extends as far west as Italy, bringing freezing conditions also in the warm South, and as far southeast as Malaysia, where it is a critical component of the northeast monsoon. Occasionally a strong Siberian High can bring unusually cold weather into the tropics as far southeast as the Philippines.

Siberian air is generally colder than Arctic air, because unlike Arctic air which forms over the sea ice around the North Pole, Siberian air forms over the cold tundra of Siberia, which is colder than the Arctic sea ice.

== Genesis and variability ==
In general, the Siberian High-pressure system begins to build up at the end of August, reaches its peak in the winter, and remains strong until the end of April. Its genesis at the end of the Arctic summer is caused by the convergence of summer air flows being cooled over interior northeast Asia as days shorten. In the process of the Siberian High's formation, the upper-level jet is transferred across northern Eurasia by adiabatic cooling and descending advection, which in extreme cases creates "cold domes" that outbreak over warmer parts of East Asia.

In spite of its immense influence on the weather experienced by a large proportion of the world's population, scientific studies of the Siberian High have been late in coming, though variability of its behavior was observed as early as the 1960s. However, recent studies of observed global warming over Asia have shown that weakening of the Siberian High is a prime driver of warmer winters in almost all of inland extra-tropical Asia and even over most parts of Europe, with the strongest relationship over the West Siberian Plain and significant relationships as far west as Hungary and as far southeast as Guangdong. Precipitation has also been found to be similarly inversely related to the mean central pressure of the Siberian High over almost all of Eastern Europe during the boreal winter, and similar relationships are found in southern China, whilst the opposite correlation exists over the Coromandel Coast and Sri Lanka. Other studies have suggested that the strength of the Siberian High shows an inverse correlation with the high-pressure systems over North Africa. Another correlation has been noted, a connection of a weaker Siberian High and Arctic oscillation when the Antarctic oscillation (AAO) is stronger.

Because increased snow and ice cover enhances the Siberian High, the Siberian High was both more intense and located further west during the early Middle Pleistocene as a result of the extensive glaciation of mountain ranges across Central Asia. The decrease in magnitude of the Siberian High during the Holocene enabled eastward encroachment of westerlies enriched with water vapour, precipitating an increase in low altitude afforestation of Central Asia.

== See also ==
- Siberian Express
- Arctic dipole anomaly
- Cold wave
- North American High
- Polar vortex
- Aleutian Low
