= Gilbert Walker (physicist) =

English physicist and statistician

Sir Gilbert Walker
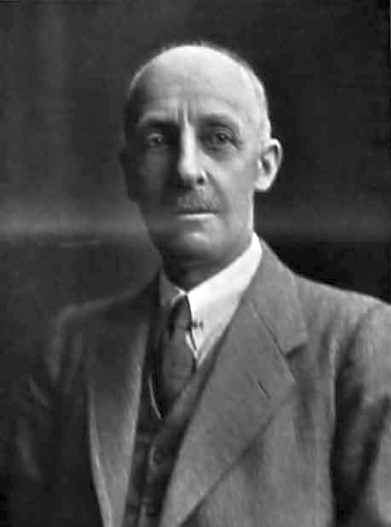
- Born: Gilbert Thomas Walker; 14 June 1868; Rochdale, Lancashire, England
- Died: 4 November 1958 (aged 90); Coulsdon, Surrey, England
- Education: Trinity College, Cambridge
- Awards: Fellow of the Royal Society; Adams Prize (1899); Knight Bachelor (1924); Symons Gold Medal (1934)
- Scientific career
- Fields: Meteorology, Statistician
- Workplaces: University of Cambridge, India Meteorological Department; Imperial College London

Sir Gilbert Thomas Walker CSI FRS (14 June 1868 – 4 November 1958) was an English physicist and statistician of the 20th century. Walker studied mathematics and applied it to a variety of fields including aerodynamics, electromagnetism and the analysis of time-series data before taking up a teaching position at the University of Cambridge. Although he had no experience in meteorology, he was recruited for a post in the Indian Meteorological Department where he worked on statistical approaches to predict the monsoons. He developed the methods in the analysis of time-series data that are now called the Yule-Walker equations. He is known for his groundbreaking description of the Southern Oscillation, a major phenomenon of global climate, and for discovering what is named after him as the Walker circulation, and for greatly advancing the study of climate in general. He was also instrumental in aiding the early career of the Indian mathematical prodigy, Srinivasa Ramanujan.

== Early life and education ==
Walker was born in Rochdale, Lancashire on 14 June 1868, the fourth child and eldest son of Thomas Walker and Elizabeth Charlotte Haslehurst. Thomas was Borough Engineer of Croydon and had pioneered the use of concrete for town reservoirs. He attended Whitgift School where he showed an interest in mathematics and got a scholarship to study at St Paul's School. He attended Trinity College, Cambridge where he was Senior Wrangler in 1889. His hard studies led to ill-health and he spent several winters recuperating in Switzerland where he learnt skating and became quite expert. He became a lecturer at Trinity College from 1895.

== Career ==
Henry Francis Blanford, the founding director of the Indian Meteorological Department, had noticed the pattern that the summer monsoon in India and Burma was correlated with the spring snow cover in the Himalayas and it became routine to use this to make predictions of the Indian monsoons. By 1892 however, these predictions began to fail and the second director John Eliot began to use several other correlations including strength of the trade winds, anticyclones, Nile floods and data from Australia and Africa. Eliot's forecasts from 1899 to 1901 failed so badly, with a drought and famine when he predicted higher than normal rains, that he was criticized severely by the newspapers leading to forecasts being made confidential from 1902 to 1905. A growing interest in the work of Lockyer on cycles led him to choose a mathematically inclined successor who would be Walker, despite his lack of experience in meteorology. Eliot himself was an able mathematician, a Second Wrangler at Cambridge, while Walker had been a Senior Wrangler. Walker was an established applied mathematician at the University of Cambridge and gave up a Fellowship at Trinity to take up a position as assistant to the meteorological reporter in 1903. He was elevated to the position of director general of observatories in India in 1904. Walker developed Blanford's idea with quantitative rigour and came up with correlation measures (with a lag) and regression equations (in time-series terminology, autoregression). He set up a group of Indian clerks to calculate correlations between weather parameters. The methods he introduced for time-series regression are now partly named after him (the other contributor was Udny Yule who studied sun-spot cycles) as the Yule-Walker equations. Analyzing vast amounts of weather data from India and lands beyond, over the next fifteen years he published the first descriptions of the great seesaw oscillation of atmospheric pressure between the Indian and Pacific Ocean, and its correlation to temperature and rainfall patterns across much of the Earth's tropical regions, including India. This is now called the El Niño Southern Oscillation. He was made a Companion of the Order of the Star of India in 1911.

Walker took an interest in several other fields. He made mathematical studies on bird flight and boomerangs. An interest in boomerangs as an undergraduate had earned him the nickname of "Boomerang Walker". In Shimla, he used to throw a boomerang on the grounds of Annandale attracting the attention even of the Viceroy of India. He found faults in the ideas on bird flight by Ernest Hanbury Hankin, fellow Cambridge scientist at Simla, and pointed out that ascending thermals had enough energy to support the soaring of birds and also pointed out the role of turbulent eddies in providing lift. He published a summary of his ten years of research in Nature in 1901. He was an accomplished flute player and took an interest in the physics of the flute. He was also an expert on the history and evolution of the flute. He made some design changes to flutes and these went into manufacture. He was also a watercolour artist and while at Shimla, held an exhibition of his works.

== Retirement to England ==
Walker continued his studies of yearly weather and climate change even after his retirement from India (in 1924 when he was knighted in the Birthday Honours) and acceptance of a professorship in meteorology at Imperial College London. He had only mixed success in his original goal, the prediction of monsoonal failures; however, his theories and broad body of supporting research represented an invaluable step forward, allowing his successors in climate study to move beyond local observation and forecasting toward comprehensive models of climate worldwide. He served as president of the Royal Meteorological Society from 1926 to 1927.

Walker was elected a Fellow of the Royal Society in 1904, long before his work on meteorology on the strength of his work in applied mathematics and applications to electromagnetism. Walker, with his talent for mathematics, was among the first to recognize the abilities of the Indian mathematical prodigy Srinivasa Ramanujan and wrote a letter to the University of Madras to support a scholarship.

Walker's interest in a wide range of subjects made him note the growing insularity of specialists:

There is, to-day, always a risk that specialists in two subjects, using languages full of words that are unintelligible without study, will grow up not only, without knowledge of each other's work, but also will ignore the problems which require mutual assistance.

== Personal life ==
Walker married Mary Constance Carter in 1908 and they had a son, Michael Ashley, and a daughter, Verity Micheline. He died at Coulsdon, Surrey on 4 November 1958. He was 90 years old. The Walker Institute in the University of Reading in the United Kingdom, established to study climate, is named in his honour.

== Publications ==
Publications related to Indian meteorology:

- Correlation in seasonal variations in climate (Introduction). Memoirs of the India Meteorological Department 20(6):
- On the meteorological evidence for supposed changes of climate in India. Memoirs of the India Meteorological Department 21(1):
- Correlation in seasonal variations of weather. II. Memoirs of the India Meteorological Department 21(2)
- Data of heavy rainfall over short periods in India. Memoirs of the India Meteorological Department 21(3)
- The liability to drought in India as compared with that in other countries. Memoirs of the India Meteorological Department 21(5)
- (with Rai Bahadur Hem Raj). The cold weather storms of northern India. Memoirs of the India Meteorological Department 21(7)
- A further study of relationships with Indian monsoon rainfall. Memoirs of the India Meteorological Department 21(8).
- Correlation in seasonal variations of weather, III. Memoirs of the India Meteorological Department 21(9)
- Correlation in seasonal variations of weather, IV, sunspots and rainfall. Memoirs of the India Meteorological Department 21(10).
- Correlation in seasonal variations of weather, V, sunspots and temperature. Memoirs of the India Meteorological Department 21(11)
- Correlation in seasonal variations of weather, VI, sunspots and pressure. Memoirs of the India Meteorological Department 21(12)
- Monthly and annual rainfall normals. Memoirs of the India Meteorological Department 22(1)
- Monthly an annual normals of number of rainy days. Memoirs of the India Meteorological Department 22(2)
- Monthly and annual normals of pressure, temperature, relative humidity, vapour tension and cloud. Memoirs of the India Meteorological Department 22(3)
- Correlation in seasonal variations of weather, VII, the local distribution of monsoon rainfall. Memoirs of the India Meteorological Department 23(2)
- Monthly and annual normal rainfall and of rainy days. Memoirs of the India Meteorological Department 23(7)
- Frequency of heavy rain in India. Memoirs of the India Meteorological Department 23(8)
- Correlation in seasonal variations of weather, VIII, preliminary study of world weather. Memoirs of the India Meteorological Department 24(4)
- Correlation in seasonal variations of weather, IX, a further study of world weather. Memoirs of the India Meteorological Department 24(9)
- Correlation in seasonal variations of weather, X, applications to seasonal forecasting in India. Memoirs of the India Meteorological Department 24(10)
- (with T.C. Kamesvara Rao) Rainfall types in India in the cold weather period, December to March 1915. Memoirs of the India Meteorological Department 24(11)

Publications on methodology:

- Walker, G.T. (1925). "On periodicity". Quarterly Journal of the Royal Meteorological Society. 51 (216): 337–346. Bibcode:1925QJRMS..51..337W. doi:10.1002/qj.49705121603.

Other topics:

- Walker, G. T. (1896). "On a dynamical top". Quarterly Journal of Pure and Applied Mathematics. 28: 175–184.
- Walker, G. T. (1895). "On a curious dynamical property of celts". Mathematical Proceedings of the Cambridge Philosophical Society. 8 (5): 305–306.

== See also ==
- Centers of action
- Rattleback
- Teleconnection
