= Atlantic multidecadal oscillation =

Climate cycle that affects the surface temperature of the North Atlantic

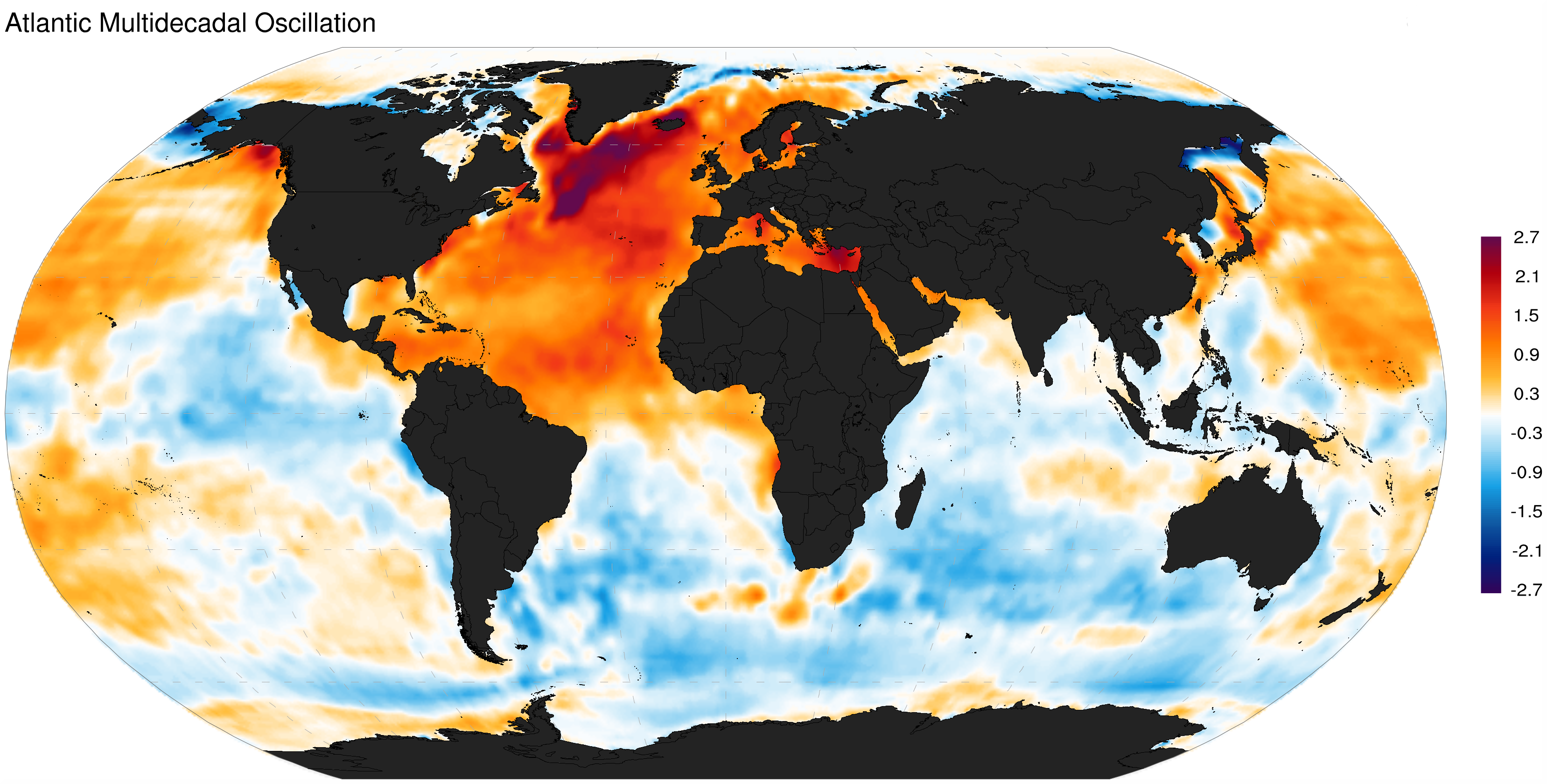
Atlantic multidecadal oscillation spatial pattern obtained as the regression of monthly HadISST sea surface temperature anomalies (1870–2013)

Atlantic Multidecadal Oscillation Index according to the methodology proposed by van Oldenborgh et al. (1880–2018)

Atlantic Multidecadal Oscillation index computed as the linearly detrended North Atlantic sea surface temperature anomalies (1856–2022)

The Atlantic Multidecadal Oscillation (AMO), also known as Atlantic Multidecadal Variability (AMV), is the theorized variability of the sea surface temperature (SST) of the North Atlantic Ocean on the timescale of several decades.

While there is some support for this mode in models and in historical observations, controversy exists with regard to its amplitude, and whether it has a typical timescale and can be classified as an oscillation. There is also discussion on the attribution of sea surface temperature change to natural or anthropogenic causes, especially in tropical Atlantic areas important for hurricane development. The Atlantic multidecadal oscillation is also connected with shifts in hurricane activity, rainfall patterns and intensity, and changes in fish populations.

== Definition and history ==
Evidence for a multidecadal climate oscillation centered in the North Atlantic began to emerge in 1980s work by Folland and colleagues, seen in Fig. 2.d.A. That oscillation was the sole focus of Schlesinger and Ramankutty in 1994, but the actual term Atlantic Multidecadal Oscillation (AMO) was coined by Michael E. Mann in a 2000 telephone interview with Richard Kerr, as recounted by Mann, p. 30 in The Hockey Stick and the Climate Wars: Dispatches from the Front Lines (2012).

The AMO signal is usually defined from the patterns of SST variability in the North Atlantic once any linear trend has been removed. This detrending is intended to remove the influence of greenhouse gas-induced global warming from the analysis. However, if the global warming signal is significantly non-linear in time (i.e. not just a smooth linear increase), variations in the forced signal will leak into the AMO definition. Consequently, correlations with the AMO index may mask effects of global warming, as per Mann, Steinman and Miller, which also provides a more detailed history of the science development.

=== AMO index ===
Several methods have been proposed to remove the global trend and El Niño-Southern Oscillation (ENSO) influence over the North Atlantic SST. Trenberth and Shea, assuming that the effect of global forcing over the North Atlantic is similar to the global ocean, subtracted the global (60°N-60°S) mean SST from the North Atlantic SST to derive a revised AMO index.

Ting et al. however argue that the forced SST pattern is not globally uniform; they separated the forced and internally generated variability using signal to noise maximizing EOF analysis.

Van Oldenborgh et al. derived an AMO index as the SST averaged over the extra-tropical North Atlantic (to remove the influence of ENSO that is greater at tropical latitude) minus the regression on global mean temperature.

Guan and Nigam removed the non stationary global trend and Pacific natural variability before applying an EOF analysis to the residual North Atlantic SST.

The linearly detrended index suggests that the North Atlantic SST anomaly at the end of the twentieth century is equally divided between the externally forced component and internally generated variability, and that the current peak is similar to middle twentieth century; by contrast the others methodology suggest that a large portion of the North Atlantic anomaly at the end of the twentieth century is externally forced.

Frajka-Williams et al. 2017 pointed out that recent changes in cooling of the subpolar gyre, warm temperatures in the subtropics and cool anomalies over the tropics, increased the spatial distribution of meridional gradient in sea surface temperatures, which is not captured by the AMO Index.

== Mechanisms ==
Based on the about 150-year instrumental record a quasi-periodicity of about 70 years, with a few distinct warmer phases between ca. 1930–1965 and after 1995, and cool between 1900–1930 and 1965–1995 has been identified. In models, AMO-like variability is associated with small changes in the North Atlantic branch of the Thermohaline Circulation. However, historical oceanic observations are not sufficient to associate the derived AMO index to present-day circulation anomalies. Models and observations indicate that changes in atmospheric circulation, which induce changes in clouds, atmospheric dust and surface heat flux, are largely responsible for the tropical portion of the AMO.

The Atlantic Multidecadal Oscillation (AMO) is important for how external forcings are linked with North Atlantic SSTs.

== Climate impacts worldwide ==
The AMO is correlated to air temperatures and rainfall over much of the Northern Hemisphere, in particular in the summer climate in North America and Europe. Through changes in atmospheric circulation, the AMO can also modulate spring snowfall over the Alps and glaciers' mass variability. Rainfall patterns are affected in North Eastern Brazilian and African Sahel. It is also associated with changes in the frequency of North American droughts and is reflected in the frequency of severe Atlantic hurricane activity.

Recent research suggests that the AMO is related to the past occurrence of major droughts in the US Midwest and the Southwest. When the AMO is in its warm phase, these droughts tend to be more frequent or prolonged. Two of the most severe droughts of the 20th century occurred during the positive AMO between 1925 and 1965: The Dust Bowl of the 1930s and the 1950s drought. Florida and the Pacific Northwest tend to be the opposite—warm AMO, more rainfall.

Climate models suggest that a warm phase of the AMO strengthens the summer rainfall over India and Sahel and the North Atlantic tropical cyclone activity. Paleoclimatologic studies have confirmed this pattern—increased rainfall in AMO warmphase, decreased in cold phase—for the Sahel over the past 3,000 years.

== Relation to Atlantic hurricanes ==
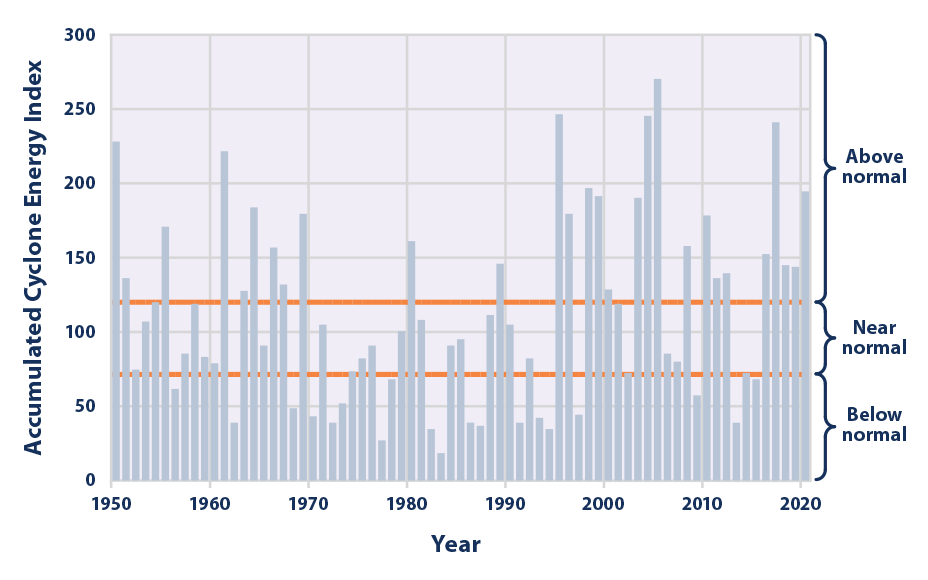
North Atlantic tropical cyclone activity according to the Accumulated Cyclone Energy Index, 1950–2015. For a global ACE graph visit this link..

A 2008 study correlated the Atlantic Multidecadal Mode (AMM), with HURDAT data (1851–2007), and noted a positive linear trend for minor hurricanes (category 1 and 2), but removed when the authors adjusted their model for undercounted storms, and stated "If there is an increase in hurricane activity connected to a greenhouse gas induced global warming, it is currently obscured by the 60 year quasi-periodic cycle." With full consideration of meteorological science, the number of tropical storms that can mature into severe hurricanes is much greater during warm phases of the AMO than during cool phases, at least twice as many; the AMO is reflected in the frequency of severe Atlantic hurricanes. Based on the typical duration of negative and positive phases of the AMO, the current warm regime is expected to persist at least until 2015 and possibly as late as 2035. Enfield et al. assume a peak around 2020.

However, Mann and Emanuel had found in 2006 that "anthropogenic factors are responsible for long-term trends in tropic Atlantic warmth and tropical cyclone activity" and "There is no apparent role of the AMO."

In 2014 Mann, Steinman and Miller showed that warming (and therefore any effects on hurricanes) were not caused by the AMO, writing: "certain procedures used in past studies to estimate internal variability, and in particular, an internal multidecadal oscillation termed the "Atlantic Multidecadal Oscillation" or "AMO", fail to isolate the true internal variability when it is a priori known. Such procedures yield an AMO signal with an inflated amplitude and biased phase, attributing some of the recent NH mean temperature rise to the AMO. The true AMO signal, instead, appears likely to have been in a cooling phase in recent decades, offsetting some of the anthropogenic warming."

== Periodicity and prediction of AMO shifts ==
There are only about 130–150 years of data based on instrument data, which are too few samples for conventional statistical approaches. With the aid of multi-century proxy reconstruction, a longer period of 424 years was used by Enfield and Cid–Serrano as an illustration of an approach as described in their paper called "The Probabilistic Projection of Climate Risk". Their histogram of zero crossing intervals from a set of five re-sampled and smoothed version of Gray et al. (2004) index together with the maximum likelihood estimate gamma distribution fit to the histogram, showed that the largest frequency of regime interval was around 10–20 year. The cumulative probability for all intervals 20 years or less was about 70%.

There is no demonstrated predictability for when the AMO will switch, in any deterministic sense. Computer models, such as those that predict El Niño, are far from being able to do this. Enfield and colleagues have calculated the probability that a change in the AMO will occur within a given future time frame, assuming that historical variability persists. Probabilistic projections of this kind may prove to be useful for long-term planning in climate sensitive applications, such as water management.

A 2017 study predicts a continued cooling shift beginning 2014, and the authors note, "..unlike the last cold period in the Atlantic, the spatial pattern of sea surface temperature anomalies in the Atlantic is not uniformly cool, but instead has anomalously cold temperatures in the subpolar gyre, warm temperatures in the subtropics and cool anomalies over the tropics. The tripole pattern of anomalies has increased the subpolar to subtropical meridional gradient in SSTs, which are not represented by the AMO index value, but which may lead to increased atmospheric baroclinicity and storminess."

== Criticism ==
In a 2021 study by Michael Mann and others, it was shown that the periodicity of the AMO in the last millennium was driven by volcanic eruptions and other external forcings, and therefore that there is no compelling evidence for the AMO being an oscillation or cycle. There was also a lack of oscillatory behaviour in models on time scales longer than El Niño Southern Oscillation; the AMV is indistinguishable from red noise, a typical null hypothesis to test whether there are oscillations in a model. Referring to the 2021 study, Michael Mann, the originator of the term AMO, put it more succinctly in a blog post on the matter: "my colleagues and I have provided what we consider to be the most definitive evidence yet that the AMO doesn't actually exist."
