= Antarctic oscillation =

Climatic cycle over the Southern Ocean

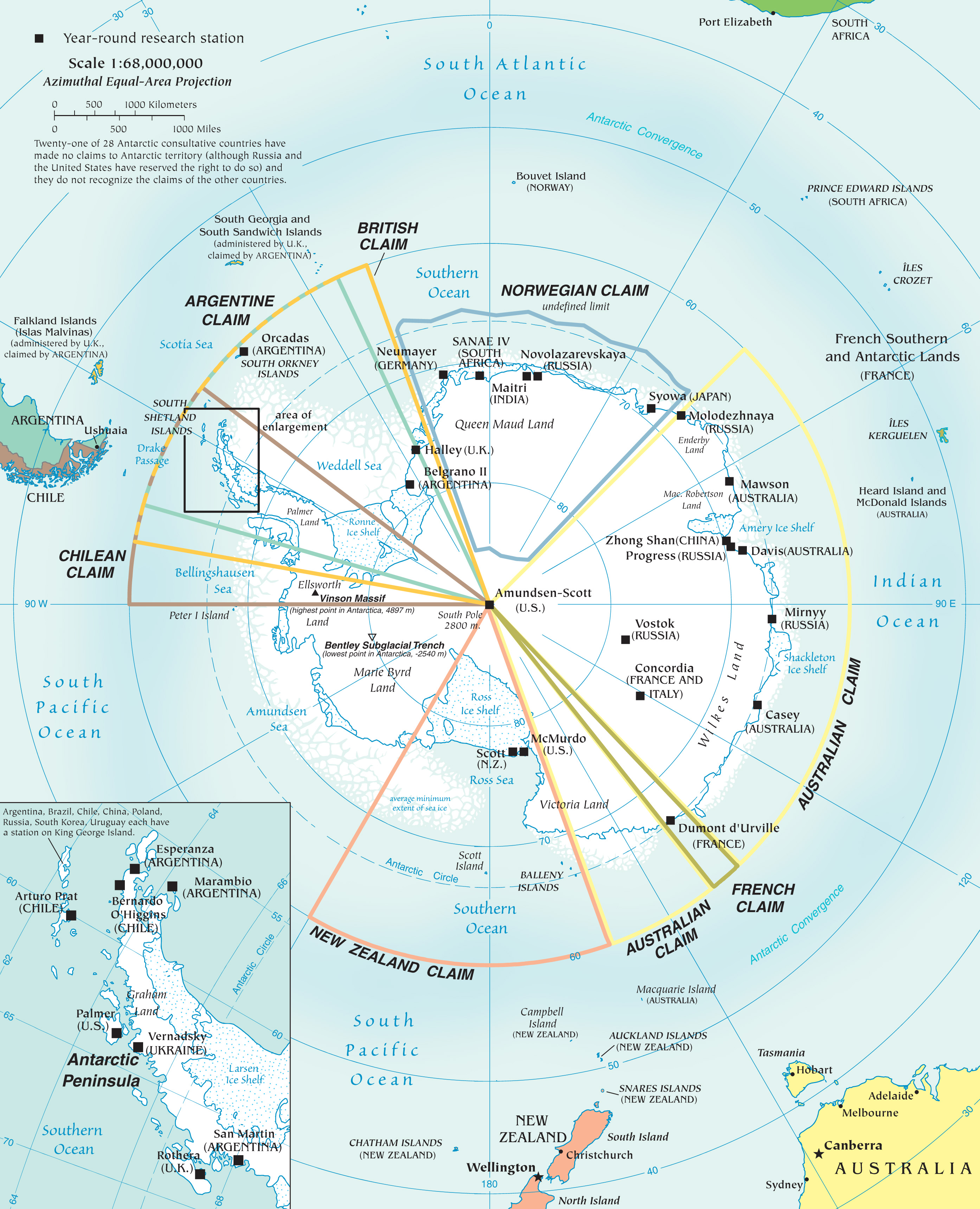
The Southern Annular Mode is usually defined as the difference in the zonal mean sea level pressure at 40°S (mid-latitudes) and 65°S (Antarctica).

The Antarctic oscillation (AAO, to distinguish it from the Arctic oscillation or AO), also known as the Southern Annular Mode (SAM), is a low-frequency mode of atmospheric variability of the Southern Hemisphere that is defined as a belt of strong westerly winds or low pressure surrounding Antarctica which moves north or south as its mode of variability. The westerly winds move closer to Antarctica during positive SAM, and away during negative SAM.

It is a climate driver for Australia, influencing the country's weather conditions – It is associated with storms and cold fronts that move from west to east that bring precipitation to southern Australia.

== Phases and impacts ==
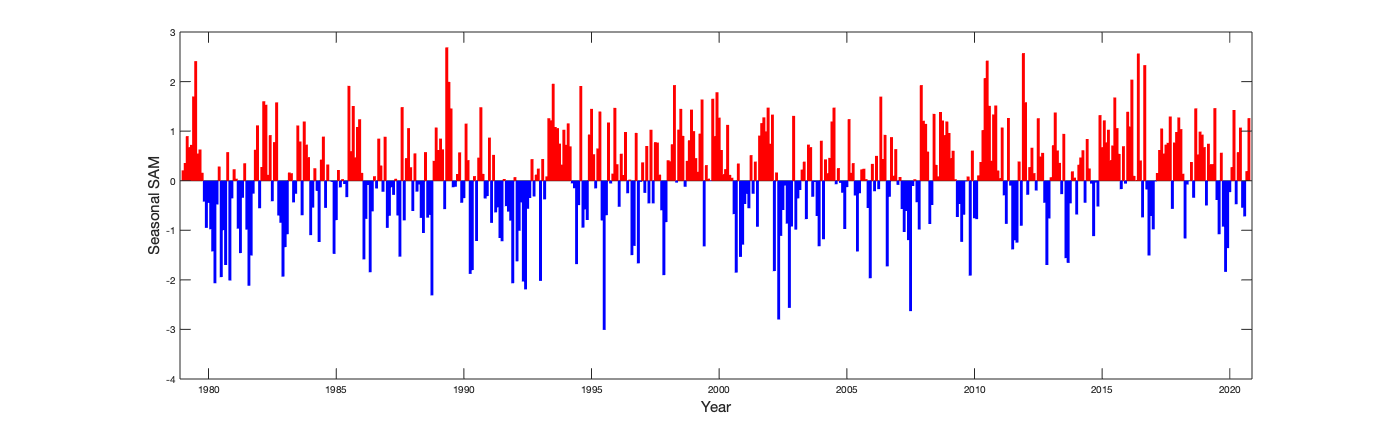
SAM from 1979 to 2020.

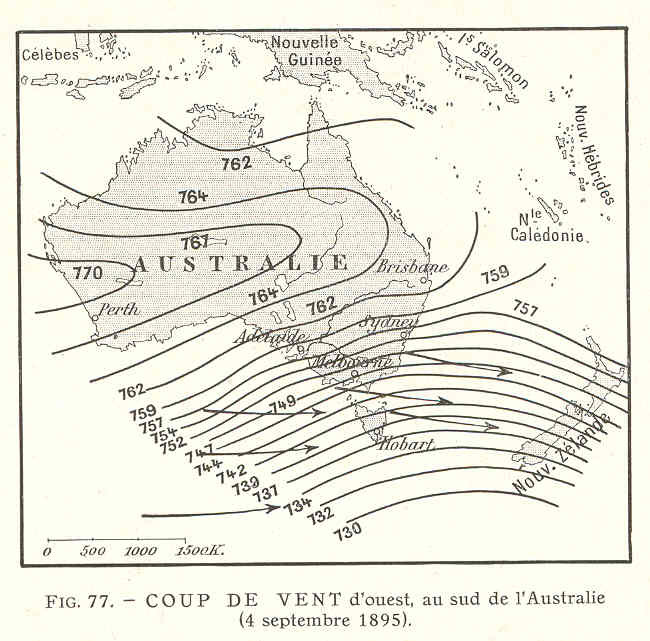
The westerly wind belt during its negative phase, as it expands towards southeastern Australia.

Both positive and negative SAM events tends to last for approximately ten days to two weeks, though the timeframe between a positive and a negative event is random. It is usually in the span of a week to a few months, with a negative SAM being more common in the cool months and a positive SAM being more prolonged in the warmer months. Winds associated with the Southern Annular Mode cause oceanic upwelling of warm circumpolar deep water along the Antarctic continental shelf, which has been linked to ice shelf basal melt, representing a possible wind-driven mechanism that could destabilize large portions of the Antarctic ice sheet.

=== Positive ===
In its positive phase, the westerly wind belt that drives the Antarctic Circumpolar Current intensifies and contracts towards Antarctica. In winter, a positive phase increases rainfall (including East coast lows) in eastern Australia (above East Gippsland up to south-east Queensland) due to greater onshore flow off the Tasman Sea; decreases rain in the south and south-west, and decreases snow coverage in the alpine areas (pushing the snow line higher up the mountain). In spring and summer, a positive phase reduces the chance of extreme heat and increases humid onshore flows, therefore making late spring and summer cooler and/or wetter than normal. A positive phase would usually occur more frequently with a La Niña event.

=== Negative ===
Its negative phase involves the belt moving towards the equator, whereby decreasing rainfall in eastern Australia and raising the possibility of spring and summer heatwaves. Moreover, winters will usually be wetter than normal in the south and south-west with more widespread snow coverage in the alpine areas (and more snow to lower-lying areas), but drier on the east coast due to less onshore flow from the east and additionally the foehn winds off the Great Dividing Range from west to east, significantly increasing temperatures and fire danger for locations east of the ranges. This phase will usually be more frequent with an El Niño event.

== Research ==
In 2014, Nerilie Abram used a network of temperature-sensitive ice core and tree growth records to reconstruct a 1000-year history of the Southern Annular Mode. This work suggests that the Southern Annular Mode is currently in its most extreme positive phase over at least the last 1000 years, and that recent positive trends in the SAM are attributed to increasing greenhouse gas levels and later stratospheric ozone depletion.

== See also ==
- Anticyclone
- Arctic oscillation
- North Atlantic oscillation
- Pacific decadal oscillation
- Roaring forties
