= Trough (meteorology) =

Elongated region of low atmospheric pressure

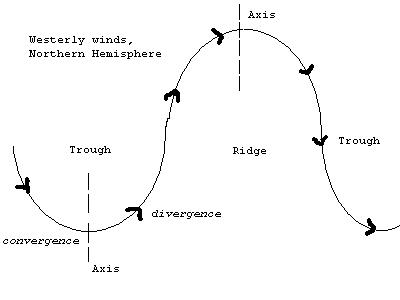
Representation of alternating troughs and ridges in upper-level westerlies for the Northern Hemisphere, with regions of convergence and divergence labeled.

A trough is an elongated region of relatively low atmospheric pressure without a closed isobaric contour that would define it as a low pressure area. Since low pressure implies a low height on a pressure surface, troughs and ridges refer to features in an identical sense as those on a topographic map.

Troughs may be at the surface, or aloft, at altitude. Near-surface troughs sometimes mark a weather front associated with clouds, showers, and a wind direction shift. Upper-level troughs in the jet stream (as shown in diagram) reflect cyclonic filaments of vorticity. Their motion induces upper-level wind divergence, lifting and cooling the air ahead (downstream) of the trough and helping to produce cloudy and rain conditions there.

Unlike fronts, there is not a universal symbol for a trough on a surface weather analysis chart. The weather charts in some countries or regions mark troughs by a line. In the United States, a trough may be marked as a dashed line or bold line. In the UK, Hong Kong and Fiji, it is represented by a bold line extended from a low pressure center or between two low pressure centers; in Macau and Australia, it is a dashed line. If they are not marked, troughs may still be identified as an extension of isobars away from a low pressure center.

== Description ==
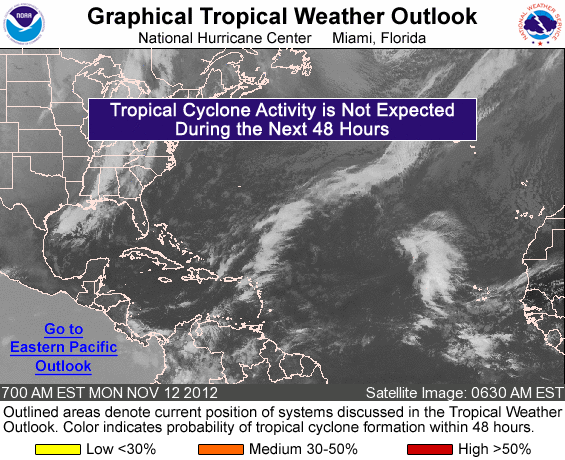
A very large trough (about 8000 km or longer) crosses the North Atlantic Ocean from north east to south west. The elongated cloud is surrounded by two big areas of higher atmospheric pressure, clearly shown with no clouds at all.

A trough is an elongated area of lower air pressure. Since pressure is closely linked to wind, there are often changes in wind direction across a trough.

If a trough forms in the mid-latitudes, a temperature difference at some distance between the two sides of the trough usually exists and the trough might become a weather front at some point. However, such a weather front is usually less convective than a trough in the tropics or subtropics (such as a tropical wave). Inversely, sometimes collapsed frontal systems will degenerate into troughs.

Sometimes the region between two high pressure centers may also assume the character of a trough when there is a detectable wind shift noted at the surface. In the absence of a wind shift, the region is designated a col, akin to a geographic saddle between two mountain peaks.

== Formation ==
A trough is the result of the movements of the air in the atmosphere. In regions where there is upward movement near the ground and divergence at altitude, there is a loss of mass. The pressure becomes lower at this point.

At upper levels of the atmosphere, this occurs when there is a meeting of a mass of cold air and another hot one along a thin ribbon called a frontal baroclinic zone. We then have the creation of a jet stream that plunges the cold air towards the equator and hot air towards the poles, creating a ripple in the circulation that is called a Rossby wave. These undulations give the hollows and peaks of altitude. In general, absolute vorticity advection is positive between these two features, but closer to the ridge, whereas it is negative just behind a trough.

At the surface, lifting air under positive vorticity advection is reflected by the formation of depressions and troughs. There will therefore be a slope between the barometric high altitude and that on the ground, this slope going towards the mass of cold air at high altitude (generally towards the Pole).

=== Positively/negatively tilted ===
Troughs have an orientation relative to the poles which is rarely North-South. In the Northern Hemisphere, positively tilted troughs will extend from the lowest pressure northeast to southwest while negatively tilted troughs have a northwest to southeast orientation. In the Southern Hemisphere, the positive tilt will be southeast to northwest and the negative one southwest to northeast.

A trough will usually begin with a positive tilt as cold air moves toward the Equator. The trough will become neutral (North-South) and then negatively tilted as the energy carried by the cold air races east through the atmospheric circulation and distorts its shape. The positive tilt is thus the building phase of the trough and the negative tilt is the dissipation of its energy. Therefore, the clouds and precipitation will develop in the positive phase and the most severe weather will be in the negative phase.

== Types of trough ==
In addition to standard troughs, some troughs may be described further with a qualifying term indicating a specific or a set of characteristics.

=== Inverted trough ===
An inverted trough is an atmospheric trough which is oriented opposite to most troughs of the mid-latitudes. Most (but not all) inverted troughs are tropical waves (also commonly called easterly waves).

Most troughs of low pressure in the mid-latitudes of the Northern Hemisphere are characterized by decreasing atmospheric pressure from south to north while inverted troughs are characterized by decreasing pressure from north to south. This situation is the opposite in the Southern Hemisphere. Inverted troughs in both hemispheres move to the west from the east, while mid-latitude troughs generally move with the westerlies toward the east.

=== Lee trough ===
A lee trough, also known as a dynamic trough, is "A pressure trough formed on the lee side of a mountain range in situations where the wind is blowing with a substantial component across the mountain ridge; often seen on United States weather maps east of the Rocky Mountains, and sometimes east of the Appalachians, where it is less pronounced." It can be formed either as a result of the adiabatic compression of sinking air on the lee side of a mountain range, or through cyclogenesis resulting from "the horizontal convergence associated with vertical stretching of air columns passing over the ridge and descending the lee slope."

== Weather associated ==
Convective cells may develop in the vicinity of troughs and give birth to a tropical cyclone. Some tropical or subtropical regions such as the Philippines or South China are greatly affected by convection cells along a trough.

In the mid-latitude westerlies, upper level troughs and ridges often alternate in a high-amplitude pattern. For a trough in the westerlies, the region just west of the trough axis is typically an area of convergent winds and descending air – and hence high pressure –, while the region just east of the trough axis is an area of fast, divergent winds and low pressure. Tropical waves are a type of trough in easterly currents, a cyclonic northward deflection of the trade winds.

== See also ==
- Asiatic low
- Geopotential height
- Surface weather analysis
