= Asiatic Low =

Low-pressure trough over southern Asia in early summer

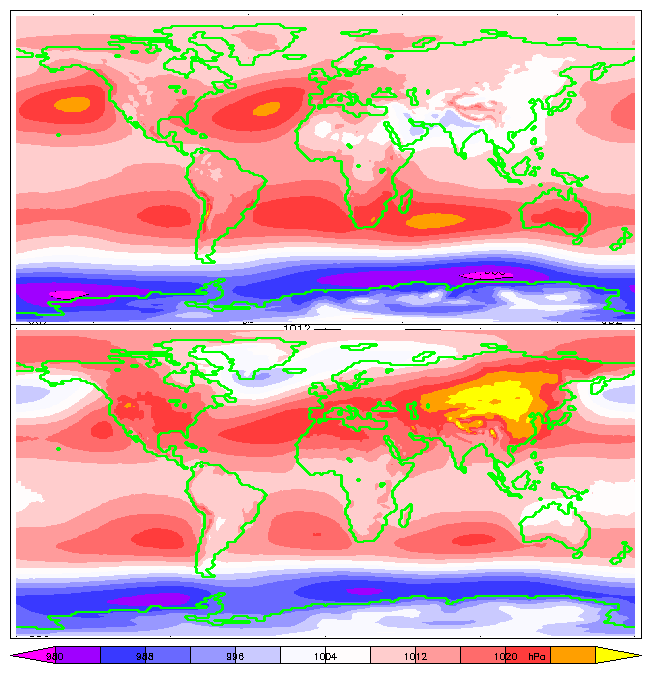
Average atmospheric pressure from June to August (top) showing the Asiatic Low (white area).

The Asiatic Low is a low-pressure trough which lies over southern Asia during early summer. It is located roughly over India, heading over the Bay of Bengal. It is a major action centre for the Northern Hemisphere during that time of the year.

It is created by more intense July sun, causing desert land areas of Northern Africa and Asia to warm rapidly.

Winds round it circle counterclockwise, from May to September or October giving persistent southwest monsoon winds from over the north Indian Ocean and South China Sea, also south-south-west or south winds over the west Pacific Ocean. Its counterpart during the winter is the Siberian High. The Asian Low is part of the Intertropical Convergence Zone (ITCZ). Winds from May to October are persistent southwesterly from the Indian Ocean and South China Sea as well as south-southwesterly or southerly over the western Pacific Ocean. This gradually generates the summer monsoon over the Indian subcontinent and Southeast Asia.

== See also ==
- Aleutian Low
- Azores High
- East Asian Monsoon
- Cyclogenesis
- Tropical wave
- Trough (meteorology)
