= Azores High =

High air pressure area in the Atlantic Ocean

Coordinates: 34°N 30°W

The Azores High, also referred to as the North Atlantic Subtropical High or more rarely, the Bermuda High, is a large semi-permanent center of high atmospheric pressure typically found around the Azores in the Atlantic Ocean, at the Horse latitudes. It forms one pole of the North Atlantic oscillation, the other being the Icelandic Low. The system influences the weather and climatic patterns of vast areas of North Africa, Europe and to a lesser extent, eastern North America. The aridity of the Sahara Desert and the summer drought of the Mediterranean Basin is primarily due to the large-scale subsidence and sinking motion of air in the system.

In boreal summer, the Azores High is strongest. When the Azores High ridges toward the United States during its expanded summer phase, this creates a deep southwest flow of hot and humid tropical air toward the East Coast of the United States, and the central pressure can sometimes be located over Bermuda (hence why it is often referred to as the Bermuda High).

This high-pressure block exhibits anticyclonic behavior, circulating the air clockwise. Due to this direction of movement, African eastern waves are impelled along the southern periphery of the Azores High away from coastal West Africa towards the Caribbean, Central America, or the Bahamas, favoring tropical cyclogenesis, especially during the hurricane season.

The Azores High exhibits a direct influence on the North Atlantic Oscillation (NAO), and the index is commonly measured by comparing the sea level pressures in Ponta Delgada, Azores and near Reykjavík, Iceland.

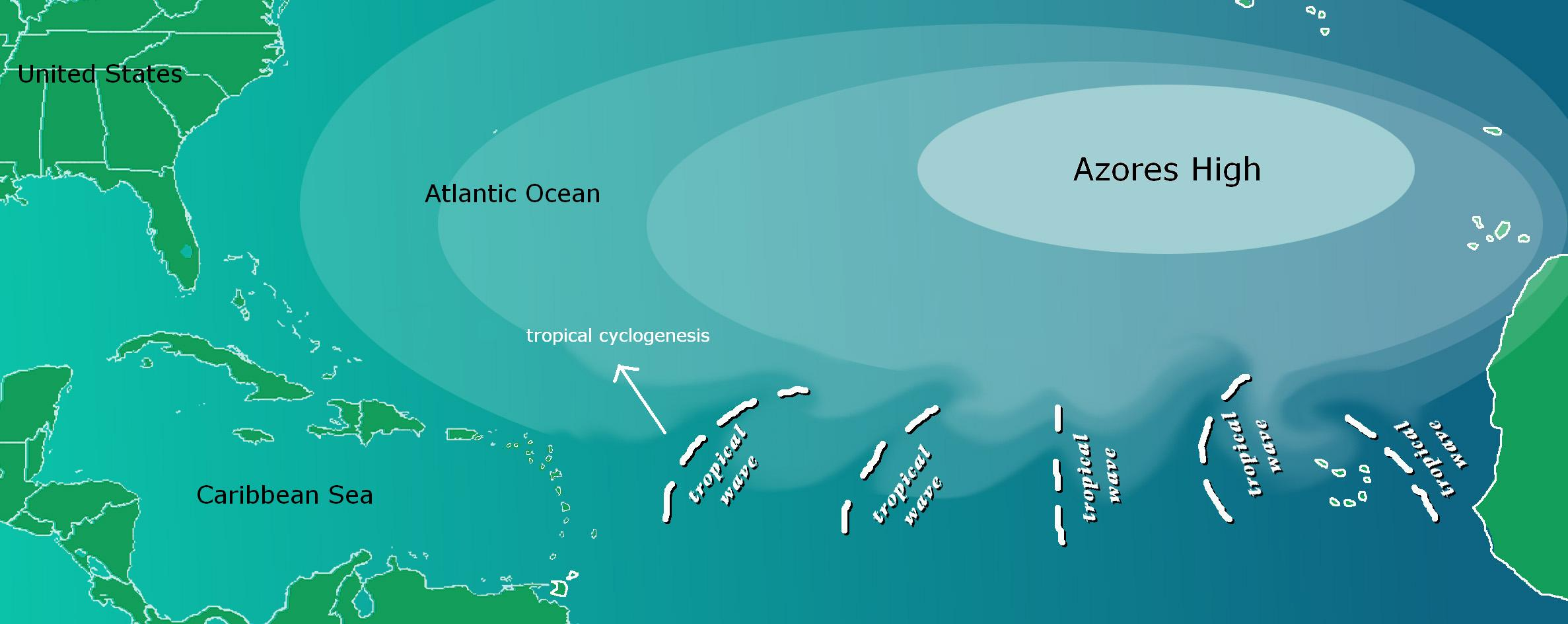
Tropical wave formation on the Atlantic Ocean.

== Variations ==
Research into global warming suggests that it may be intensifying the Azores High in some years, independently of oscillations such as ENSO, leading to more precipitation extremes across the Southeastern United States as well as drier summers and milder winters across Western Europe. Latitudinal displacement of the ridge is also occurring, and computer models depict more westward expansion of the anticyclone in the future. However, during the winter of 2009–2010, the Azores High was smaller and weaker than usual, allowing sea surface temperatures in the Central Atlantic to increase quickly, as well as resulting in a cold winter across much of Europe.

== See also ==
- Asiatic Low
- Hadley cell
- Cold front
- Mediterranean tropical cyclone
