= Empirical orthogonal functions =

Spatial statistical signal analysis

In statistics and signal processing, the method of empirical orthogonal function (EOF) analysis is a decomposition of a signal or data set in terms of orthogonal basis functions which are determined from the data. The term is also interchangeable with the geographically weighted Principal components analysis in geophysics.

The i ^{th} basis function is chosen to be orthogonal to the basis functions from the first through i − 1, and to minimize the residual variance. That is, the basis functions are chosen to be different from each other, and to account for as much variance as possible.

The method of EOF analysis is similar in spirit to harmonic analysis, but harmonic analysis typically uses predetermined orthogonal functions, for example, sine and cosine functions at fixed frequencies. In some cases the two methods may yield essentially the same results.

The basis functions are typically found by computing the eigenvectors of the covariance matrix of the data set. A more advanced technique is to form a kernel out of the data, using a fixed kernel. The basis functions from the eigenvectors of the kernel matrix are thus non-linear in the location of the data (see Mercer's theorem and the kernel trick for more information).

== See also ==
- Blind signal separation
- Multilinear PCA
- Multilinear subspace learning
- Nonlinear dimensionality reduction
- Orthogonal matrix
- Signal separation
- Singular spectrum analysis
- Transform coding
- Varimax rotation
