= Diffenbaugh =

Diffenbaugh is a surname. Notable people with the surname include:

- Noah Diffenbaugh (born 1974), American climate scientist
- Vanessa Diffenbaugh (born 1978), American author

== See also ==
- John Deffenbaugh, American politician
