= Noah Diffenbaugh =

American climate scientist

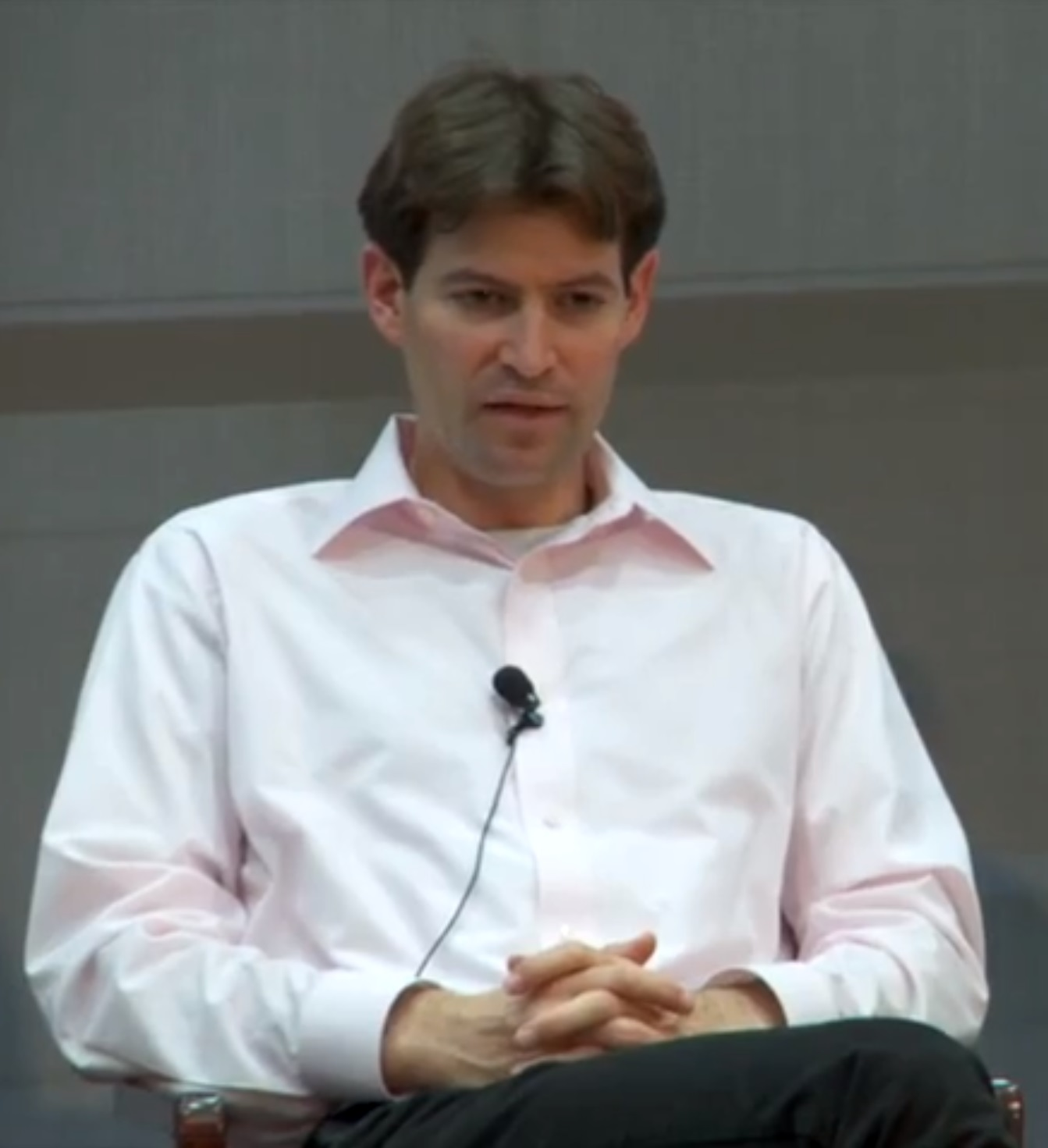
- Diffenbaugh in 2014
- Born: Noah S. Diffenbaugh; July 23, 1974 (age 52); Santa Cruz County, California, U.S.
- Education: B.S. Stanford University (Earth Systems, 1997), M.S. Stanford University (Earth Systems, 1997), Ph.D. University of California, Santa Cruz (Earth Sciences, 2003)
- Known for: climate change, science communication
- Awards: Elected Fellow, William Kaula Award and James R. Holton Award from the American Geophysical Union, CAREER award from the National Science Foundation, Kavli Fellow of the National Academy of Sciences
- Scientific career
- Fields: Earth sciences, climatology
- Workplaces: Stanford University, Purdue University, University of California, Santa Cruz
- Thesis: Global and regional controls on Holocene environments (2003)
- Doctoral advisor: Lisa C. Sloan
- Other academic advisors: Paul Koch, Patrick J. Bartlein
- Doctoral students: Daniel Swain
- Website: Stanford Profile page

Noah S. Diffenbaugh (born July 23, 1974) is an American climate scientist at Stanford University, where he is the William Wrigley Professor of Earth System Science and Kimmelman Family Senior Fellow in the Stanford Doerr School of Sustainability. He is the inaugural Editor-in-Chief of the peer-review journal Environmental Research: Climate (published by IOP Publishing). From 2015-2018, he served as editor-in-chief of the peer-review journal Geophysical Research Letters (published by American Geophysical Union). He is known for his research on the climate system, including the effects of global warming on extreme weather and climate events such as the 2011-2017 California drought.

== Scientific research ==
Diffenbaugh received his Ph.D. in Earth Sciences from the University of California, Santa Cruz in 2003. His dissertation was entitled "Global and regional controls on Holocene environments". His dissertation focused on understanding regional climate change in paleoclimate periods and in modern periods. His dissertation introduced the hypothesis that as vegetation responds to changes in climate, those changes could impact coastal ocean systems by altering the atmospheric pressure patterns that drive coastal winds.

In 2004, Diffenbaugh began a faculty position at Purdue University. While at Purdue, he published first results of high-resolution regional climate simulations for large continental areas, including the United States, Europe and India, which enabled analysis of the role of fine-scale climate processes in extreme events. These high-resolution climate model simulations also enabled analyses of potential impacts of climate change on a suite of systems, including premium winegrapes, corn pests, and snowmelt runoff.

In 2009, Diffenbaugh moved to a faculty position at Stanford University. He continued his work on the dynamics and impacts of fine-scale climate change, and also began working in the emerging area of "extreme event attribution". This work culminated in the publication of a new, generalized framework for testing the influence of global warming on individual extreme weather and climate events.

The extreme event for which Diffenbaugh is most well known is the 2011-2017 California drought. From 2014-2016, Diffenbaugh's research group published three widely cited papers analyzing the drought and the role of global warming. These studies analyzed the role of high temperature in amplifying the effects of low precipitation, as well as the role of the Ridiculously Resilient Ridge, a term coined by Diffenbaugh's then-Ph.D. student Daniel Swain to describe the large area of persistently high atmospheric pressure that blocked many storms from reaching California for much of the drought.

At Stanford, Diffenbaugh also began collaborations to quantify the economic impacts of climate change. This work has included quantifying the economic damages associated with different levels of global warming (including the levels identified in the UN Paris Agreement), as well as the role that global warming has played in shaping economic inequality between countries.

== Science communication ==
Diffenbaugh is active in science communication. He has served on a number of government science panels, including the Intergovernmental Panel on Climate Change, the United States Climate Change Science Program, and the California Climate-Safe Infrastructure Working Group.

Diffenbaugh has written a number of opinion articles. He was an early adopter of Hangouts On Air, through which he conducted open discussions about climate change with the public.

In 2017, Diffenbaugh was the faculty moderator for Stanford University's Three Books Program, in which all incoming first-year undergraduate students are sent three books over the summer, and the authors come to campus for a panel discussion during New Student Orientation.

== Personal life ==
Diffenbaugh grew up at Mount Madonna Center, an intentional community in the Santa Cruz Mountains of California that was founded in 1978 by Diffenbaugh's parents and other students of Baba Hari Dass. He attended Mount Madonna School from kindergarten through high school, graduating in 1992.

Diffenbaugh attended college at Stanford University, where he was a member of the varsity men's volleyball team. After college, he returned to Mount Madonna Center for three years. During that time, he taught high school science and coached volleyball at Mount Madonna School, before entering graduate school at the University of California, Santa Cruz, where he describes struggling to find a sense of scientific confidence and direction.

Diffenbaugh and his wife Polly Diffenbaugh live on the Stanford campus, and have three children. He is the grandson of computer pioneer Erwin Tomash, and brother-in-law of novelist Vanessa Diffenbaugh.
