= The Language of Flowers =

The language of flowers, or floriography, is cryptological communication through the use or arrangement of flowers.

(The) Language of Flowers may also refer to:

- Hanakotoba, the Japanese language of flowers
- "The Language of Flowers" (Elgar), an 1872 song by Edward Elgar based on a poem by James Gates Percival
- The Language of Flowers (Lorca), a 1935 play by Federico García Lorca
- The Language of Flowers (novel), a 2011 novel by Vanessa Diffenbaugh
- "The Language of Flowers" (Rosemary & Thyme), a 2003 television episode
