= North Pacific High =

Weather phenomenon off the California coast

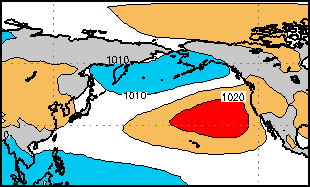

The North Pacific High is a semi-permanent, subtropical anticyclone located in the northeastern portion of the Pacific Ocean, located northeast of Hawaii and west of California. It is part of the great belt of anticyclones known as the subtropical ridge. It is strongest during the northern hemisphere summer and shifts towards the equator during the winter, when the Aleutian Low becomes more active. It is responsible for California's typically dry summer and fall and typically wet winter and spring, as well as Hawaii's year-round trade winds.

During the 2011–2017 California drought, the North Pacific High persisted longer than usual, due to a mass of warm water in the Pacific Ocean, resulting in the Ridiculously Resilient Ridge. This significantly limited the number of powerful winter storms that were able to reach California, resulting in historic drought conditions in that state for several years.

== See also ==
- California Current
- El Niño–Southern Oscillation
- North Pacific Current
- South Pacific High
