= Coral bleaching in Oahu =

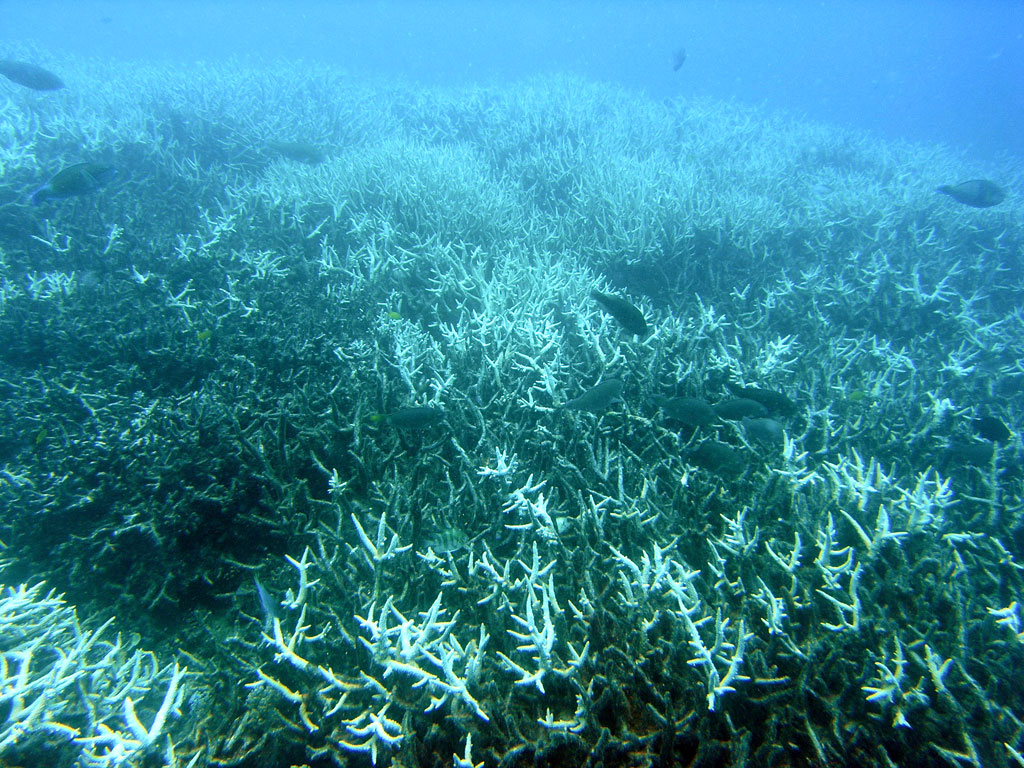
A dying coral reef due to Coral bleaching

Coral bleaching in Oahu has been on the rise since 1996, when Hawaii's first major coral bleaching occurred in Kaneohe Bay, followed by major bleaching events in the Northwest islands in 2002 and 2004. In 2014, biologists from the University of Queensland observed the first mass bleaching event, and attributed it to The Blob.

Coral bleaching turns the coral white, but it does not kill it right away. Depending factors like what type of coral is it, and temperature of the water in that specific area, decide on how long the coral has. Coral bleaching effects in Hawaii are primarily caused by water temperature increases due to climate change. A rise in the water temperature is a stressor to the coral. When stressed, the coral releases algae that lives in their tissues, so when released they lose all of their color, turning them white.

== Areas impacted by coral bleaching ==
The amount of bleached coral is increasing around the island of Oahu. As of November 2019, two secluded beaches on the island, Yokohama bay and Makua beach have had reports of coral bleaching. Also including around Daniel K. Inouye International Airport, these areas have 75% or more of coral bleached. The main cause of this mass bleaching event is by the rise in the water temperature of as small as two to three degrees Fahrenheit. The types of corals include the two most popular corals of Hawaii, the Rose or Cauliflower coral. These corals are 10–20 inches (250–510 mm) in diameter.

=== Kaneohe Bay reef ===
The Kāneʻohe Bay reef is eight miles (13 km) in length and 2.7 miles (4.3 km) in width. A second barrier reef covers 27 miles (43 km) off the coast of Molokaʻi island in the archipelago. About 40 years ago there were raw sewage dumps in Kaneohe Bay, killing some coral. The sewage gave the advantage to a growing benthic algae species. The green algae Dictyosphaeria cavernosa, formed mat like structures covering and killing some of the coral. And the corals that the algae did not reach, the sewage and the low water quality had weaken them over time. The corals reproduction cycle was slowed and more likely to contract a disease. In 1996, when coral bleaching started to Kaneohe Bay, the corals were effected by the algae growth. This meant that the corals were still weak and the rise in ocean temperatures played a role the amount of bleaching that effected the coral. In 2014 it was noted that 80% of coral in Kaneohe Bay had been bleached white. It is predicted by Kuulei Rogers of the Hawaiʻi Institute of Marine Biology, that "In the 2030s, 30 to 50 percent of the years will have major bleaching events in Hawaii."
