= James Gates Percival =

American poet

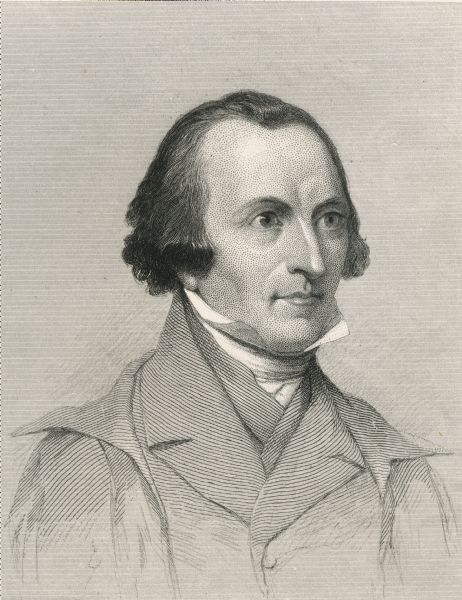
- Born: September 15, 1795; Berlin, Connecticut
- Died: May 2, 1856 (aged 60); Hazel Green, Wisconsin
- Citizenship: American
- Writing career
- Genre: Poetry

James Gates Percival (September 15, 1795 – May 2, 1856) was an American poet, surgeon, and geologist.

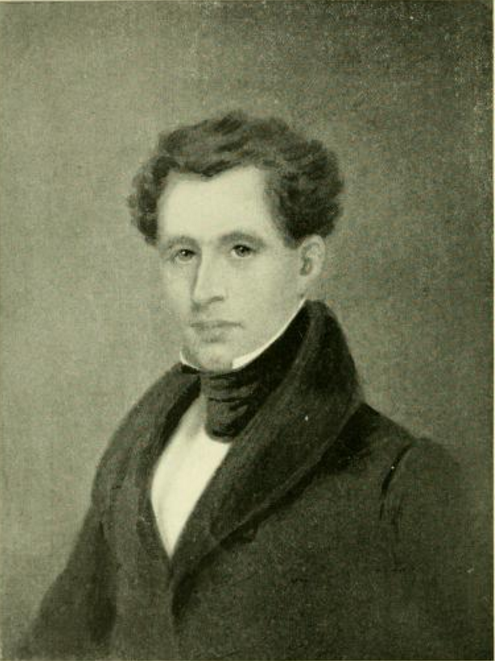
Portrait of James Gates Percival, said to be painted by his brother

== Biography ==
James Gates Percival was born in Berlin, Connecticut. He entered Yale College at the age of 16 and graduated at the head of his class at the age of 20. After graduating, he pursued a career in medicine and relocated to Charleston, South Carolina. In 1823, a volume of his collected poems was published in New York and London. In 1824, he briefly served as a professor of chemistry at West Point before resigning and dedicating several years to assisting Noah Webster in editing his American Dictionary of the English Language, published in 1828.

In 1835, the governor of Connecticut commissioned Percival to prepare a geological survey of the state, which he completed and published in 1842. In 1854, he was appointed as the State Geologist for Wisconsin and tasked with conducting a similar geological survey. The first annual report was issued in 1855, but while preparing the second annual report, Percival fell ill and died in May 1856 in Hazel Green, Wisconsin. Most of his life was spent at his home in New Haven, Connecticut.

== Writing ==
Percival wrote poetry on various subjects and in a wide variety of meters. His sentimentalism and diction appealed to a wide audience, earning him a reputation as the foremost poet in the United States during the 1820s. Some of his most famous poems include "Prometheus", "The Coral Grove", and "The Graves of the Patriots".

== Select works ==
- Poems (1821)
- Clio. No. 1-2 (1822)
- Prometheus, Part II, with Other Poems (1823)
- Poems (1823)
- A Geographical View of the World Embracing the Manners, Customs, and Pursuits of Every Nation, ed. (1825)
- Poem delivered before the Connecticut Alpha of the Phi Beta Kappa Society (1826)
- Clio. No. 3 (1827)
- French composer Elise Rondonneau (active 1827-1860s) used
- Report on the Geology of the State of Connecticut (1842)
- The Dream of a Day (1843).
- Annual Report of the Geological Survey of the State of Wisconsin (1855-1856)

== Legacy ==
- French composer Elise Rondonneau (active 1827-1860s) used Percival’s text for her song “Mon Etoile d’Amour.”
- A short poem by him, "The Language of Flowers", was set to music by the English composer Edward Elgar at the age of fourteen.

== Sources ==
- McVeagh, Diana M. (2007). Elgar the Music Maker. Woodbridge, Suffolk: Boydell Press. ISBN 978-1-84383-295-9.
- The Poetical Works of James Gates Percival. With a Biographical Sketch. Boston: Ticknor & Fields. 1859.
- Life and Letters of James Gates Percival, by J.H. Ward (Boston: Ticknor & Fields, 1866).
- Chisholm, Hugh, ed. (1911). "Percival, James Gates" . Encyclopædia Britannica. Vol. 21 (11th ed.). Cambridge University Press.
- Housley, Kathleen L. (2023). Stone Breaker: The Poet James Gates Percival and the Beginning of Geology in New England. Wesleyan University Press.
