= Block (meteorology) =

Large-scale patterns in the atmospheric pressure field that are nearly stationary

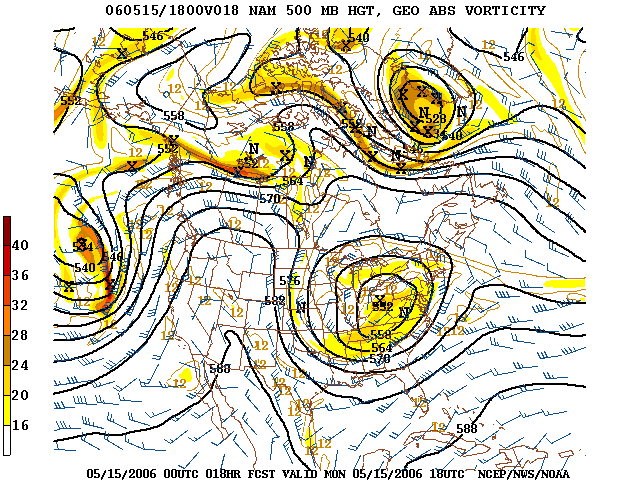
An example of an omega block over western North America in May 2006

Blocks in meteorology are large-scale patterns in the atmospheric pressure field that are nearly stationary, effectively "blocking" or redirecting migratory cyclones. They are also known as blocking highs or blocking anticyclones. These blocks can remain in place for several days or even weeks, causing the areas affected by them to have the same kind of weather for an extended period of time (e.g. precipitation for some areas, clear skies for others). In the Northern Hemisphere, extended blocking occurs most frequently in the spring over the eastern Pacific and Atlantic Oceans. While these events are linked to the occurrence of extreme weather events such as heat waves, the onset and decay in particular of these events is still not well captured in numerical weather forecasts. It remains an open area of research.

== Impact of the polar vortex ==
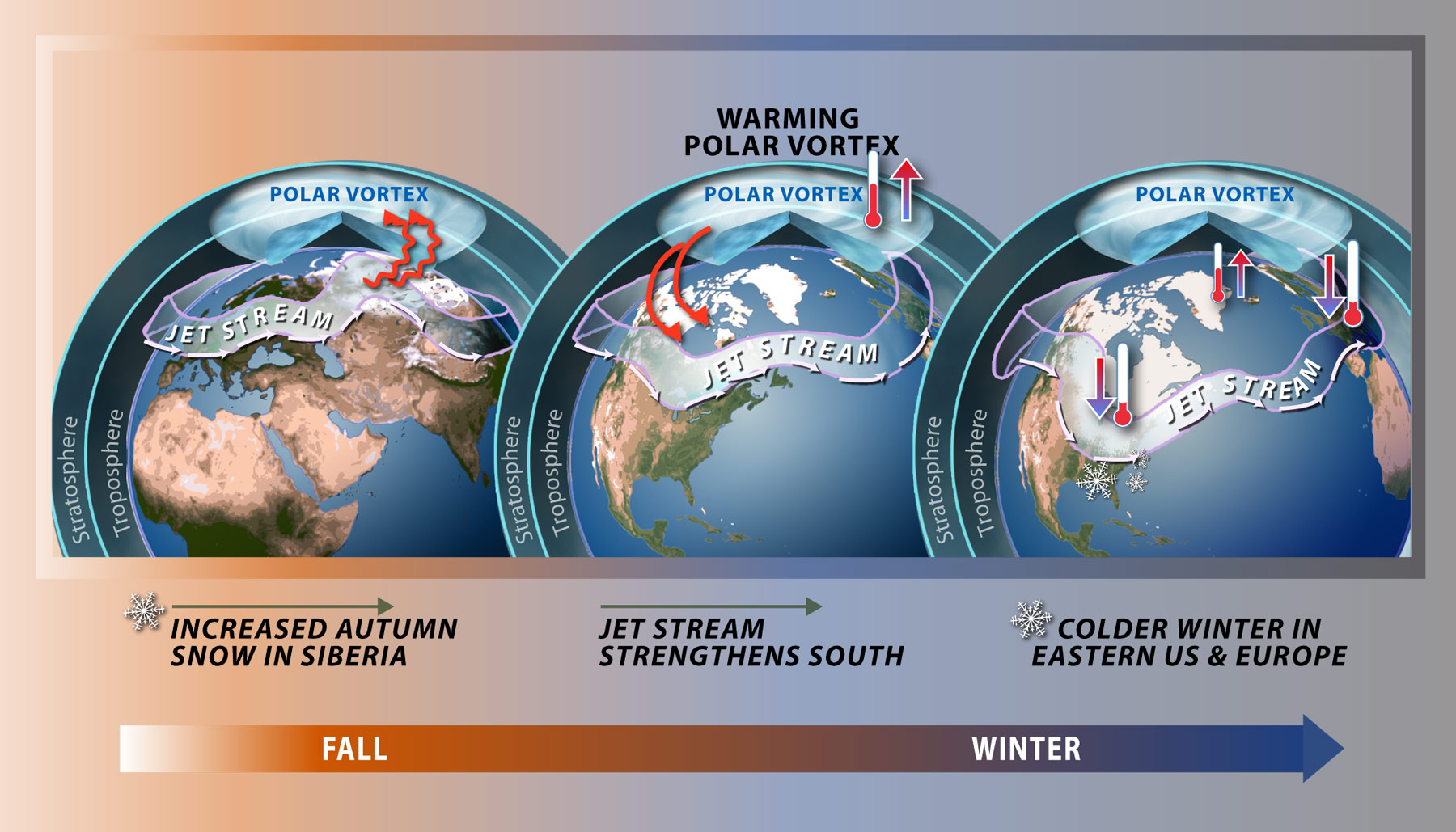
Polar vortex and weather impacts due to stratospheric warming

Polar cyclones are climatological features which hover near the poles year-round. They are weaker during summer and strongest during winter. When the polar vortex is strong, the Westerlies increase in strength. When the polar cyclone is weak, the general flow pattern across mid-latitudes buckles and significant cold outbreaks occur. Extratropical cyclones which occlude and migrate into higher latitudes create cold-core lows within the polar vortex. Volcanic eruptions in the tropics lead to a stronger polar vortex during the winter for as long as two years afterwards. The strength and position of the cyclone shapes the flow pattern across the hemisphere of its influence. An index which is used in the Northern Hemisphere to gauge its magnitude is the Arctic oscillation.

== Omega blocks ==
Omega blocks are so named because the isobars or geopotential height contours with which they are associated in the Northern Hemisphere resemble an Ω, the uppercase Greek letter omega. They typically have a low-high-low pattern, arranged in the west–east direction.

== Rex blocks ==
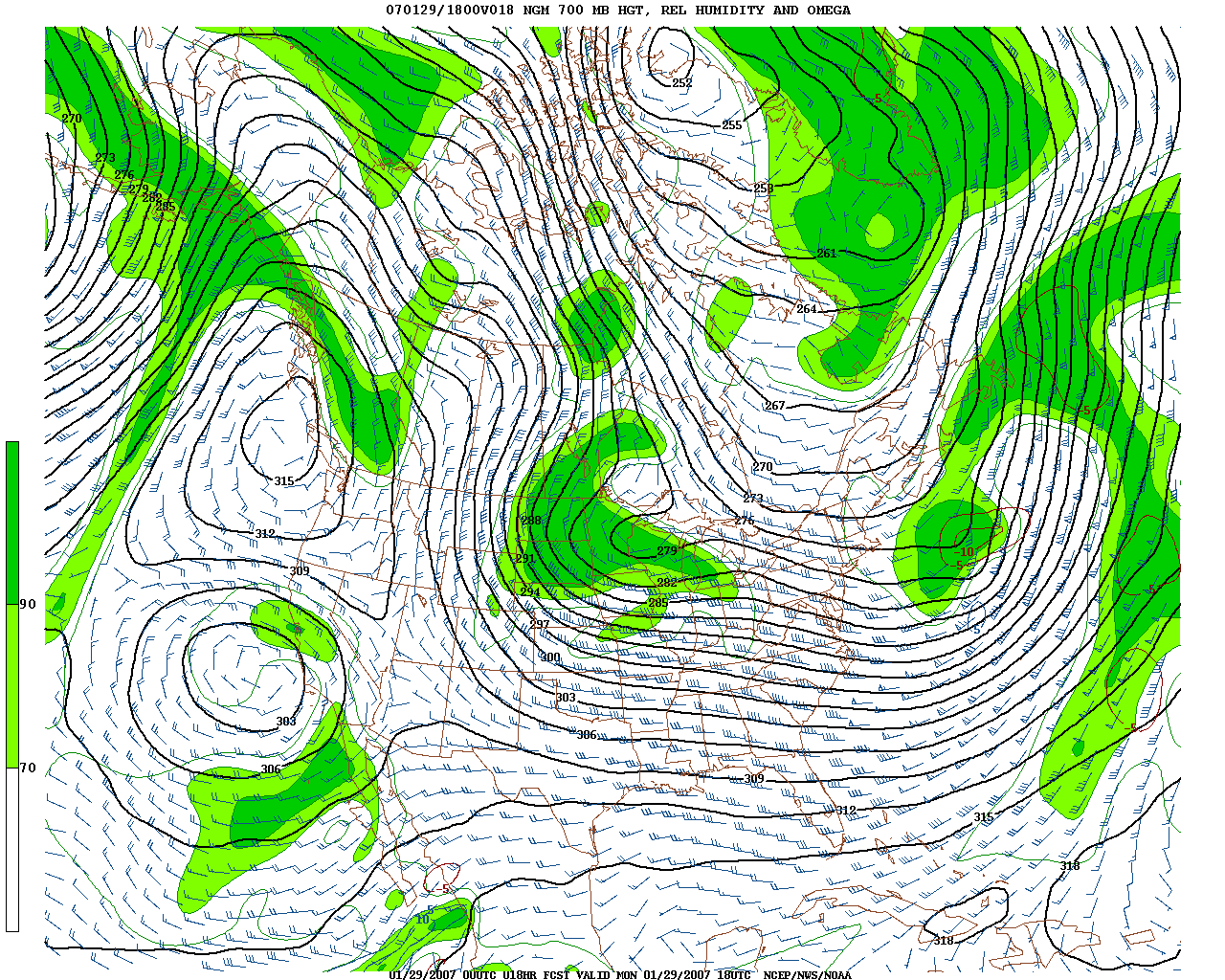
An example of a Rex block off the West coast of North America in January 2007

Rex blocks (or dipole blocks) consist of a high situated poleward (north in the Northern Hemisphere; south in the Southern Hemisphere) of a low. Very often both the high and the low are closed, meaning that the isobars (or constant geopotential height lines) defining the high–low close to form a circle. Rex blocks are named after meteorologist Daniel F. Rex, who first identified them in 1950.

== Cut-off highs and lows ==
When an upper-level high- or low-pressure system becomes stuck in place due to a lack of steering currents, it is known as being "cut off". The usual pattern which leads to this is the jet stream retreating poleward, leaving the then cut-off system behind. Whether or not the system is of high- or low-pressure variety dictates the weather that the block causes. Precisely this situation occurred over the southern United States during late spring and early summer of 2007, when a cut-off-low system hovering over the region brought unusually cool temperatures and an extraordinary amount of rain to Texas and Oklahoma (see June 2007 Texas flooding), and a cut-off-high near the coast of Georgia that caused a drought in the Southeast that same year. Rainy, cooler weather results if the block is a low in the US. Hurricane Ian in the last week of September 2022 drifted northward and its remnants became detached from the jet stream, resulting in a stationary low pressure system spinning off the Northeastern US and bringing several days of precipitation until a front finally moved through on 6 October.

== Blocking high ==
If the block is a high, it will usually lead to dry, warm weather as the air beneath it is compressed and warmed, as happened in southeastern Australia in 2006 and 1967 with resultant extreme droughts. However, when a blocking high is situated in the Tasman Sea it can cause torrential rains in eastern Australia, as in the cases of the 2021 and 2022 flood events. A blocking high in the southern Tasman Sea directs low pressure systems and troughs towards eastern Australia, whereby providing rainfall on the east coast of Australia.

In Australia, blocking highs generally occur in the Great Australian Bight and the Tasman Sea, which are powerful high-pressure systems that usually develop further south than normal. They stay virtually unmoving for a lengthy period (i.e. several days to weeks) and thus block the regular easterly motion of weather systems across southern Australia.

== Cold air damming ==
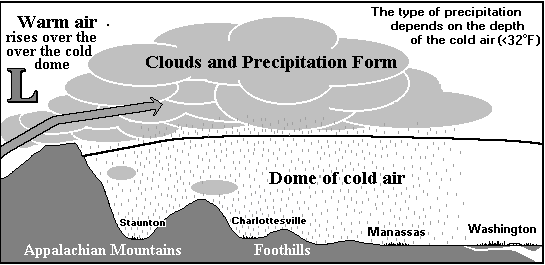
When warm air ahead of an oncoming storm system overrides cool air trapped east of a mountain range, cloudiness and precipitation can occur for prolonged periods of time

Blocking of atmospheric systems near the surface of the Earth occurs when a well-established poleward high pressure system lies near or within the path of the advancing storm system. The thicker the cold air mass is, the more effectively it can block an invading milder air mass. The depth of the cold air mass is normally shallower than the mountain barrier which created the cold air damming, or CAD. Some events across the Intermountain West can last for ten days. Pollutants and smoke can remain suspended within the stable air mass of a cold air dam.

== Midlatitude cold waves ==
In the middle latitudes of the Northern Hemisphere, areas on the eastern side of blocking anticyclones or under the influence of anomalous flows from colder continental interiors related to blocks experience severe winters, a phenomenon which has been known since the discovery of the North Atlantic Oscillation (NAO) in the 1840s. These blocking patterns also have a tendency to produce anomalously mild conditions at very high latitudes, at least in those regions exposed to anomalous flow from the ocean as in Greenland and Beringia, or from chinook winds as in Interior Alaska.

Such cold winters over the contiguous United States and southern Canada as 1911/12, 1935/36, 1949/50, 1977/78 and 1978/79, 1993/94, and 2017/18 resulted from blocks in the Gulf of Alaska or to the east of the Mackenzie Mountains directing very cold Arctic air with a long trajectory as far as the American South, as did the Western cold waves of 1889/90 and January 1950. In Northern and Western Europe, cold winters such as 1683/84, 1739/40, 1794/95, 1829/30, 1894/95, 1916/17, 1941/42, February 1947 and 1962/63 are almost always associated with high latitude Atlantic blocking and an equatorward shift of the polar jet stream to Portugal and even Morocco. Over Central Asia, unusually cold winters like 1899/1900, 1929/30 and 1930/31, 1944/45, 1954/55 and 1968/69 are associated with blocking near the Ural Mountains extending the Siberian High westwards to push the very cold air from the Siberian "cold pole" outward towards the Aral and Caspian Seas. Unlike other midlatitude regions of the Northern Hemisphere, however, cold winters in Europe (e.g. 1916/17, 1962/63) are often very mild over Central Asia, which can gain warm air advection from subtropical cyclones pushed to the south under negative NAO conditions.

== Heat waves ==
Heat waves in summer are the result of similar blocking patterns, typically involving the placement of the semi-permanent subtropical ridge. Some unusually intense summers such as 1936 in the United States, 1999, 2002, and 2011, and in Europe summers such as 1976, 2003 European heat wave, and 2019, were the result of entrenched highs that became detached from the jet stream for a prolonged period of time and allowed warm, dry air to build in place. In many cases such as the 1999 US drought, the heat wave was preceded by prior months of below normal precipitation that prevented temperatures from cooling. The 2003 heat wave in Europe occurred, conversely, during a year that North America experienced markedly below normal temperatures and higher than normal precipitation, especially during the spring months. The high amount of rain in North America increased the energy levels in the polar jet, driving it far to the north in Europe and resulting in a prolonged, static high pressure ridge that drove up hot air from the Sahara Desert into Europe.

== See also ==
- Anticyclone
- Geopotential height
- Heat dome
- High-pressure area
- Ridiculously Resilient Ridge
- Trough (meteorology)
