= Elise Rondonneau =

French composer

Elise Foucher Rondonneau (active 1827-1860s) was a widely-published French composer of songs and works for harmonium, organ and piano. She married Jules Rondonneau. Little is known about her life.

Rondonneau’s works were published by E. Gallet, Katto, Kistner, Lebeau, Henry Lemoine, J. Meissonnier, Mustel & Fils, and Schott. They include:

== Keyboard ==
- Andante et Villanelle (harmonium, organ)
- Chanson Bretonne (harmonium, organ)
- Fleurs du Nord (piano)
- Jenny, Valse (piano)
- Lamento (harmonium)
- Mazurka de Salon (piano)
- Nenia, Elegie (harmonium, organ, piano)
- Nocturne (harmonium)
- Polka-Mazurka (piano)
- Risoluta, Valse (piano)
- Sophronie, Valse (piano)
- Two Improvisations (harmonium)
- Un Reve (harmonium, organ)
- Valses Brillantes: Souvenirs des Ardennes (piano)

== Vocal ==
- “A Paris Chez Heu Rue de la Chaussée d Antin” (text by Hippolyte Guerin)
- “Adieu, Savoie” (text by Eugene Delcuse)
- “Brune Fleur d’Italie” (text by Emile Barateau)
- Coulez mes Jours”
- “J’ai Remplace Frere”
- “J’aime Mieux mon Village”
- “Mes Amours de Toujours: Depuis que sous l’Ombrage”
- “Mon Etoile d’Amour” (text by James Gate Percival)
- “Mort du Patre” (text by Jules Rondonneau; music by Elise Rondonneau; guitar accompaniment by Jean Antoine Meissonnier, elder brother of Jean Racine Meissonier)
- “Ne Laissez Pas Mourir Mon Père” (text by Eugene Delcuse)
- “Notre Barone”
- “Ou tu Serais”
- “Page de Monseigneur”
- “Pays de Mes Amours”
- “Priere des Pecheurs” (text by anonymous)
- “Yvonee”
