= The Language of Flowers (novel) =

Book by Vanessa Diffenbaugh

- First edition
- Author: Vanessa Diffenbaugh
- Publisher: Ballantine Books
- Publication date: 2011
- Publication place: United States
- Media type: Print (Paperback)
- Pages: 334 pages

The Language of Flowers is the debut novel of American author Vanessa Diffenbaugh. It was published in 2011 by Ballantine Books. The novel follows the fraught life of a Victoria Jones, who by the age of 18, had lived in 32 foster homes, and becomes a flower arranger.

The novel was inspired by a flower dictionary, a type of Victorian-era book which defines what different types of flowers mean. Diffenbaugh also published a new non-fiction "A Victorian Flower Dictionary" to accompany the novel. The novel was recommended for use in book clubs.

== Themes ==
The plot of the novel focuses on finding love, adoption, emancipation, homelessness, single motherhood and attachment disorder, but the main focus is on the foster system. The SFGate reviewer Malena Watrous described the novel as much less "grittier" than other discussions of the foster system, which Watrous partially attributes to Diffenbaugh's own adoption of children from that system.

Though the flowers within the novel largely function as symbols for Victoria, expressing emotional meaning, the novel also includes a large amount of information about the biology of flowers. New York Times Reviewer Janet Maslin described this information as sometimes becoming overly pedantic, saying "the pointed use of flower definitions in conversation begins to pale as a gambit." Conversely, NPR called this motif "organic," growing from the first scene in a flower marketplace.

== Style ==
The New York Times reviewer Janet Maslin praised the descriptive language, saying "There is sensuality to Ms. Diffenbaugh’s descriptions of flowers and food." The novel interlaces the main plot of an 18 year old Victoria, with snippets of her past in the foster system.

== Reception ==
Reception of the novel was generally positive. Washington Post reviewer Brigitte Weeks called the novel an "original and brilliant first novel" which has "united her fascination with the language of flowers—a long-forgotten and mysterious way of communication—with her firsthand knowledge of the travails of the foster-care system." For Weeks, the "novel is both enchanting and cruel, full of beauty and anger." The New York Times compared the novel to something "Dickens might have come up with, had Dickens been deeply interested in flower arranging."

SFGate called the novel "an unexpectedly beautiful book about an ugly subject: children who grow up without families, and what becomes of them in the absence of unconditional love." Waltrous compares the novel to Jane Eyre, identifying the novel as part of the "story of an orphan rising above her circumstances" with motifs like a tortured romance.

== Film adaptation ==
In 2019, it was announced there will be a film adaptation of the novel starring Nick Robinson and Kiersey Clemons and directed by Michael Mayer.
