= Ridiculously Resilient Ridge =

Extremely persistent anticyclone over the Pacific Ocean

The Ridiculously Resilient Ridge, here depicted by cool-season seasonal geopotential height anomalies (November–March) during 2012–2015. Adapted from

The "Ridiculously Resilient Ridge", sometimes shortened to "Triple R" or "RRR", was a persistent anticyclone that occurred over the far northeastern Pacific Ocean, contributing to the 2011–2017 California drought. The "Ridiculously Resilient Ridge" nickname was originally coined in December 2013 by Daniel Swain on the Weather West Blog, but has since been used widely in popular media as well as in peer-reviewed scientific literature.

== Features ==
The Ridiculously Resilient Ridge was characterized by a broad region of anomalously positive geopotential height on monthly to annual timescales. This persistent high pressure system acted to "block" the prevailing mid-latitude westerlies, shifting the storm track northward and suppressing extratropical cyclone (winter storm) activity along the West Coast of the United States. Such a pattern is similar to—but of greater magnitude and longevity than—atmospheric configurations noted during previous California droughts.

== Associations ==
This anomalous atmospheric feature disrupted the North Pacific storm track during the winters of 2012–13, 2013–14, and 2014–15, resulting in extremely dry and warm conditions in California and along much of the West Coast. The Ridge comprised the western half of a well-defined atmospheric ridge-trough sequence associated with an unusually amplified "North American winter dipole" pattern, which brought persistent anomalous cold and precipitation to the eastern half of North America in addition to record-breaking warmth and drought conditions in California.

This ridge of high pressure was also associated with a blob of high water temperatures in the Pacific Ocean, which resulted in substantial warming along the western coast of North America as well as adverse ecological impacts. However, it is generally thought that "The Blob" of warm ocean water was caused by the persistence of the ridge and subsequent reduction in vertical ocean mixing due to storms, rather than the reverse. On the other hand, recent research suggests that unusual oceanic warmth in the western tropical Pacific Ocean may have played a role in triggering and maintaining the Triple R over successive seasons. High amplitude atmospheric ridge patterns similar to the Triple R have occurred more frequently in recent decades and there is evidence that the occurrence of persistent North Pacific geopotential height anomalies and anomalously dry California winters, will increase due to global warming, although uncertainty remains regarding the magnitude of these future changes.

== See also ==
- North Pacific High
- Block (meteorology)
