= Ridge (meteorology) =

Elongated region of high atmospheric pressure

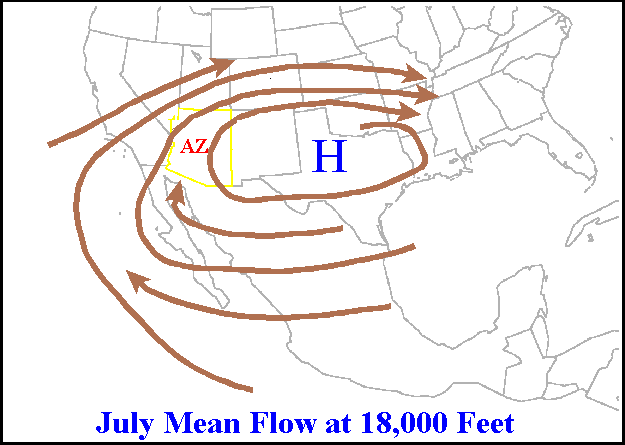
Ridge line extending to the left of the high pressure center (H).

In meteorology, a ridge or barometric ridge is an elongated area of relatively high atmospheric pressure compared to the surrounding environment, without being a closed circulation. It is associated with an area of maximum anticyclonic curvature of wind flow. The ridge originates in the center of an anticyclone and sandwiched between two low-pressure areas, and the locus of the maximum curvature is called the ridge line. This phenomenon is the opposite of a trough.

== Description ==
Ridges can be represented in two ways:

- On surface weather maps, the pressure isobars form contours where the maximum pressure is found along the axis of the ridge.
- In upper-air maps, geopotential height isohypses form similar contours where the maximum defines the ridge.

== Related weather ==
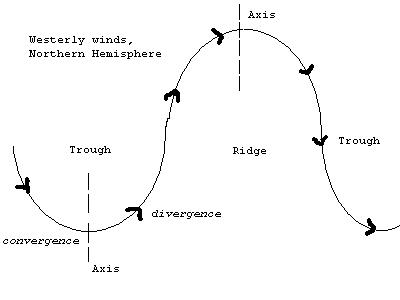
Airflow around troughs and ridges in upper troposphere in the northern hemisphere

Given the direction of the winds around an anticyclonic circulation and the fact that weather systems move from west to east:

- ahead of an upper-ridge, the airflow that comes from the polar regions and brings cold air.
- behind the upper-ridge line, the flow that comes from the equator and brings mild air.

Surface ridges, just like highs, generate fair weather because they develop under wind convergence in the negative vorticity advection zone ahead of the upper-level ridge. The vertical downward air motion then gives a divergence of the winds near the surface. The subsidence of the air causes a warming in the column compared to the previous environment and therefore a drying of it because its relative humidity decreases, which has the effect of clearing the sky.

=== Subtropical ridge ===
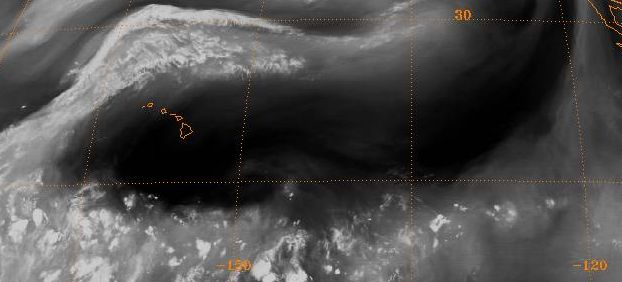
Clouds dissipating in the subtropical ridge.

An important atmospheric ridge is the subtropical ridge. It is a series of ridges near the horse latitude characterized by mostly calm winds, which act to reduce air quality under its axis by causing fog overnight, and haze during daylight hours as a result of the stable atmosphere found near its location. The air descending from the upper troposphere flows out from its center at surface level toward the upper and lower latitudes of each hemisphere, creating both the trade winds and the westerlies. It helps steer tropical cyclones and the monsoon.

=== Ridge blocking ===
Blocks in meteorology are large-scale patterns in the atmospheric pressure field that are nearly stationary, effectively "blocking" or redirecting migratory cyclones. These blocks can remain in place for several days or even weeks, causing the areas affected by them to have the same kind of weather for an extended period of time (e.g. precipitation for some areas, clear skies for others). Upper ridges are often associated with such blocks, particularly in Omega blocks.
