= The Language of Flowers (Elgar) =

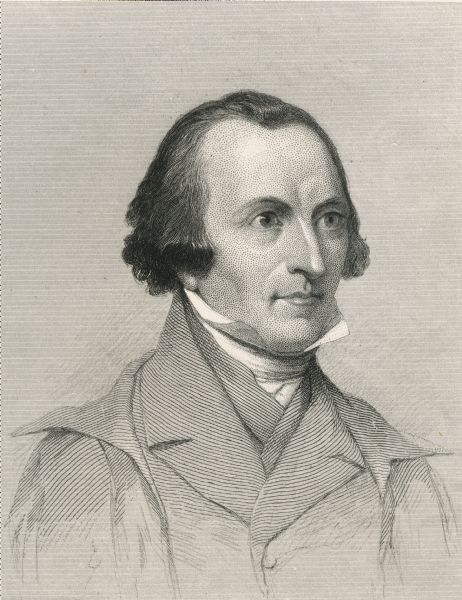
James Gates Percival

"The Language of Flowers" is an unpublished song from a poem by the American geologist and poet James Gates Percival, with music written by the English composer Edward Elgar when he was only fourteen years old.

It is dated 29 May 1872, inscribed "by Edward W. Elgar", with "words by Percival" (at first thought to be Elgar himself) and dedicated "to my sister Lucy on her birthday."

== Lyrics ==
THE LANGUAGE OF FLOWERS

In Eastern lands they talk in flow'rs

And they tell in a garland their loves and cares;

Each blossom that blooms in their garden bowr's,

On its leaves a mystic language bears.

The rose is a sign of joy and love,

Young blushing love in its earliest dawn,

And the mildness that suits the gentle dove,

From the myrtle's snowy flow'rs is drawn.

Innocence gleams in the lily's bell,

Pure as the heart in its native heaven.

Fame's bright star and glory's swell

By the glossy leaf of the bay are given.

The silent, soft and humble heart,

In the violet's hidden sweetness breathes,

And the tender soul that cannot part,

In a twine of evergreen fondly wreathes.

The cypress that daily shades the grave,

Is sorrow that moans her bitter lot,

And faith that a thousand ills can brave,

Speaks in thy blue leaves "forget-me-not".

Then gather a wreath from the garden bowers,

And tell the wish of thy heart in flowers.

== Recordings ==
"The Unknown Elgar" includes "The Language of Flowers" performed by Teresa Cahill (soprano), with Barry Collett (piano).
