= The Blob (Pacific Ocean) =

Warm water mass off the Pacific Northwest coast

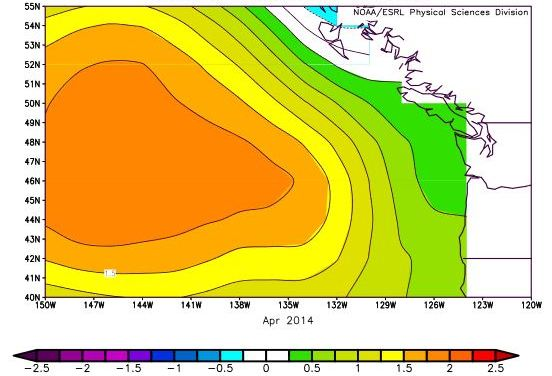
The Blob is an anomalous body having sea surface temperature much above normal, seen here in a graphic of April 2014 by the NOAA.

The Blob was a large mass of relatively warm water in the Pacific Ocean off the coast of North America that was first detected in late 2013 and continued to spread throughout 2014 and 2015. It is an example of a marine heatwave. Sea surface temperatures indicated that the Blob persisted into 2016, but it was initially thought to have dissipated later that year.

By September 2016, the Blob resurfaced and made itself known to meteorologists. The warm water mass was unusual for open ocean conditions and was considered to have played a role in the formation of the unusual weather conditions experienced along the Pacific coast of North America during the same time period. The warm waters of the Blob were nutrient-poor and adversely affected marine life.

In 2019 another scare was caused by a weaker form of the effect referred to as "The Blob 2.0", and in 2021, the appearance of "The Southern Blob" south of the equator near New Zealand caused a major effect in South America, particularly Chile and Argentina.Large water heatwaves have accured in the northeast Pacific in every year from 2019 through 2025, including a record sized one in 2025.

== Origin ==
The Blob was first detected in October 2013 and early 2014 by Nicholas Bond and his colleagues at the Joint Institute for the Study of the Atmosphere and Ocean of the University of Washington. It was detected when a large circular body of seawater did not cool as expected and remained much warmer than the average normal temperatures for that location and season.

Bond, then the state climatologist for Washington, coined the term the Blob, with the term first appearing in an article in the monthly newsletter of the Office of the Washington State Climatologist for June 2014.

== Description ==
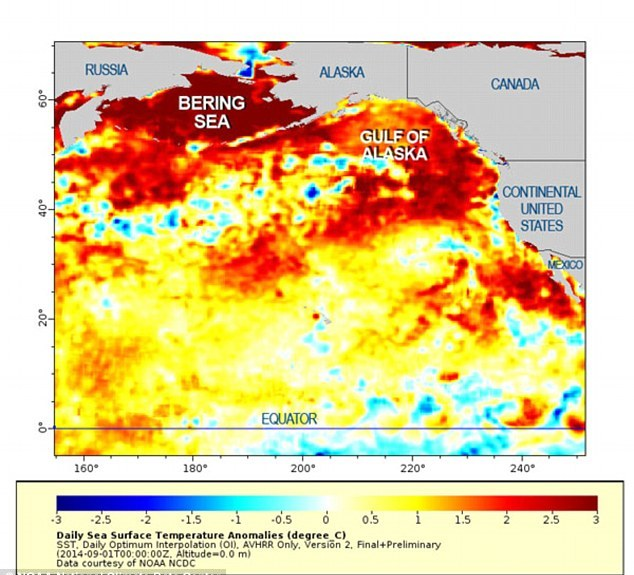
The three "blobs" of warm water can be seen off the North American coast, ranging from Alaska to Mexico, seen in this graphic dated 1 September 2014.

Initially the Blob was reported as being 500 miles (800 km) wide and 300 feet (91 m) deep. It later expanded and reached a size of 1,000 miles (1,600 km) long, 1,000 miles (1,600 km) wide, and 300 feet (91 m) deep in June 2014 when the term the Blob was coined. The Blob then hugged the coast of North America from Mexico to Alaska and beyond, stretching more than 2,000 miles (3,200 km), and formed three distinct patches: the first, off the coast of Canada, Washington, Oregon, and northern California, a region known to oceanographers as the Coastal Upwelling Domain; the second in the Bering Sea off the coast of Alaska; and the third and smallest off the coast of southern California and Mexico.

In February 2014, the temperature of the Blob was around 2.5 °C (4.5 °F) warmer than what was usual for the time of year. A NOAA scientist noted in September 2014 that, based on ocean temperature records, the North Pacific Ocean had not previously experienced temperatures so warm since climatologists began taking measurements.

In 2015 the atmospheric ridge causing the Blob finally disappeared. The Blob weakened through 2016. However, in its wake are many species that will take a long time to recover. Although the original Blob is gone for now, scientists predict that similar marine heat waves are becoming more common due to the Earth's warming climate. Residual heat from the first blob in addition to warmer temperatures in 2019 led to a second Blob scare. However, it was quelled by a series of storms that cooled the rising temperatures.

== Cause ==
The immediate cause of the phenomenon was the lower than normal rates of heat loss from the sea to the atmosphere, compounded with lower than usual water circulation resulting in a static upper layer of water. Both of these are attributed to a static high pressure region in the atmosphere, termed the Ridiculously Resilient Ridge, which was formed in the spring of 2014. The lack of air movement impacted the wind-forced currents and the wind-generated stirring of surface waters. These in turn influenced the weather in the American Pacific Northwest from the winter of 2013–2014 onward and may have been associated with the unusually hot summer experienced in the continental American Pacific Northwest in 2014.

The reason for the phenomenon remains unclear, but it is speculated to partially be human caused climate change. Some experts consider that the wedge of warm water portends a cyclical change with the surface waters of the mid-latitude Pacific Ocean flipping from a cold phase to a warm phase in a cycle known as the Pacific decadal oscillation (PDO). This poorly-understood change happens at irregular intervals of years or decades. During a warm phase, the west Pacific becomes cooler and part of the eastern ocean warms; during the cool phase, these changes reverse. Scientists believe a cold phase started in the late 1990s and the arrival of the Blob may have been the start of the next warm phase. The PDO phases may also be related to the likelihood of El Nino events.

The implementation of China's clean air action plan in 2013 may have inadvertently contributed to the Blob, by removing pollution that had blocked and scattered heat from the Sun. However, experts stress that this was one of many factors, including, notably, greenhouse gas emissions.

In April 2015, NASA climatologist William Patzert suggested that if the PDO was at work here, there would be widespread climatological consequences and southern California and the American south may be in for a period of high precipitation with an increase in the rate of global warming. Another climatologist, Matt Newman of the University of Colorado, does not think the Blob fits the pattern of a shift in the PDO. He believes the unusually warm water is due to the persistent area of high pressure stationary over the northeastern Pacific Ocean. Dan Cayan of the Scripps Institution of Oceanography is unsure about the ultimate cause of the phenomenon, but states "there's no doubt that this anomaly in sea surface temperature is very meaningful".

== Effects ==
=== Ecosystem disruption ===
Sea surface temperature anomalies are a physical indicator which adversely affect the zooplankton (mainly copepods) in the northeast Pacific Ocean and specifically in the Coastal Upwelling Domain. Warm waters are much less nutrient-rich than the cold upwelling waters which were normal until recently off the Pacific coast. This resulted in reduced phytoplankton productivity with knock-on effects on the zooplankton which fed on it and the higher levels of the food chain. Species lower in the food web that prefer colder waters, which tend to be fattier, were replaced by warmer water species of lower nutritional value. For example, between 2012 and 2021, humpback whale populations were estimated to have declined by roughly one quarter. To add, a 2024 population study showed that North Pacific humpback whales declined by about 20% between 2012 and 2021, from around 33,500 to 26,700, which the authors attributed to reduced prey in the heatwave. As prey availability decreased, whales increasingly moved towards coastal regions in search of food.

The Northwest Fisheries Science Center in Seattle predicted reduced catches of coho and Chinook salmon, a major contributing factor being the raised temperatures of seawater in the Blob. Salmon catches dropped as the fish migrated away having found low levels of zooplankton.

Thousands of sea lion pups have starved in California which lead to forced beachings. Thousands of Cassin's auklets in Oregon have starved due to lack of food.Between October 2014 and March 2015, more than 9,000 dead Cassin's auklets washed ashore from California to British Columbia, this is over 100 times the normal rate, which researchers attributed to starvation after the zooplankton community shifted toward lipid-poor species.

Animals that favored warm southern waters were spotted as far north as Alaska, examples being the warm water thresher sharks (Alopias spp) and ocean sunfish (Mola mola). In the spring of 2016, acres of Velella velella were reported in the waters south of the Copper River Delta.

The discovery of a skipjack tuna (Katsuwonus pelamis), primarily a fish of warm tropical waters, off Copper River, in Alaska, 200 miles (320 km) north of the previous geographic limit, and a dead sooty storm-petrel (Oceanodroma tristrami), a species native to Northern Asia and Hawaii, along with a few brown boobies (Sula leucogaster) in the Farallon Islands of California, besides other such records, has led marine biologists to worry that the food web across the Pacific is in danger of disruption.

The Blob contributed to the largest recorded outbreak of the neurotoxin domic acid on the west coast of North America. The toxin was found in lots of stranded marine mammals, and the bloom led to closures of razor clam, rock crab, and Dungeness crab fisheries.

Biologists from the University of Queensland observed the first-ever mass bleaching event for Hawaiian coral reefs in 2014, and attributed it to the blob.

Kelp forest invertebrates benefited from the event as well as from the 1997-1998 El Niño event.

=== Weather and seasons ===
Research from the University of Washington found positive temperature anomalies in the northeast Pacific Ocean (upper ~100 m, greater than 2.5 °C, with temperatures at the coast below normal) for the winter period of 2013–2014. Heat loss from the ocean during the winter was suppressed. During spring and summer 2014 the warmer sea surface temperature anomalies reached coastal waters. The anomaly may have had a significant effect on the unusually warm summer of 2014, with record high temperatures over parts of land in the Pacific Northwest. Offshore sea surface temperatures (SSTs) in the northeast Pacific for the month of February were the greatest at least since the 1980s, possibly as early as 1900. Additionally they found anomalous sea surface pressure SSP, with a peak magnitude approaching 10 hPa, a record high value for the years of 1949–2014.

Canadian senior climatologist David Phillips noted in May 2015 about the coming winter season, "If that blob continues, if it stays warm ... and then you add to that El Nino, it may complement each other and then it may be the year winter is cancelled."

In summer 2019, a second large and warm anomaly, nicknamed "the Blob 2.0," formed in the northeast Pacific. The original Blob peaked in the winter, this one peaked in the summer. The weaker winds reduced evaporative cooling and mixing of the upper ocean, and the warmer water then thinned low clouds, which let in more sunlight and increased the warming.

== See also ==
- Cold blob (North Atlantic)
- Special Report on the Ocean and Cryosphere in a Changing Climate
