= Cold wave of 1978 =

Weather event in the Eastern United States

The cold wave of 1978 was a weather event that occurred in the Eastern United States. Beginning in December 1977 and lasting until March, it produced one of the coldest winters on record in all states east of the Rocky Mountains, except Maine.

== Timeline ==
=== December ===
During December 1977, a cold wave started around the eastern United States. This cold wave heavily hit Michigan and Ohio, whose average winter temperature was to be the second lowest in recorded history, rivaled only by an even colder wave that hit the previous winter.

=== January ===
Like most cold waves of the 1970s, temperatures in January dropped to extreme lows. Wind chills across the plains fell to between −70 and −80 °F (−56.7 and −62.2 °C). Severe cold pounded from the Plains states to the Eastern seaboard, where frequent frontal storms caused record snowfall and extreme blizzards, which caused some areas to declare a state of emergency. Schools and business were closed when pipelines froze over, and driving conditions were severe. Blowing snow meant that roads could not be cleared, and hundreds of automobile accidents were caused by the blizzard conditions. Tanks had to be used to remove stranded vehicles on some highways.

Insulation by the very heavy northeastern snow led to severe damage to major roads by potholes, as liquid water was able to erode the tar more effectively.

=== February ===
In February, Ohio, Indiana, Illinois Kentucky, and West Virginia saw their coldest February since record-keeping began. Severe cold still covered areas from the Northeast and Midwest. Schools began to close because of the extreme cold. Homeless people had a hard time finding shelter, causing some deaths. Snow and blowing wind created dangerous wind chills. Due to blowing snow, ice, and severe cold, semi trucks had their deliveries delayed. Some locations saw a record-long period of below 0 °F (−17.8 °C) weather.

=== March ===
The severe cold wave ameliorated only slightly in March, and as late as March 25 a severe storm with freezing rain brought down powerlines in Illinois, hindering rescue efforts by shutting down telephone communications. April, when average or even above average temperatures occurred for the first time since November 1977, saw the real end of the cold wave, but snow melting and flooding caused damage to some locations. Sioux Falls saw its second coldest winter on record during the previous months. The severe eastern winter was sufficient to make 1978 the eleventh coolest calendar year for the contiguous US since 1895, and the coolest since 1929. However, 1979 would be an even cooler year across the United States.

== See also ==
- 1936 American cold wave
