= 2011–2017 California drought =

Severe drought

Progression of the drought from December 2013 to July 2014

The 2011–2017 California drought persisted from December 2011 to March 2017 and consisted of the driest period in California's recorded history, late 2011 through 2014. The drought wiped out 102 million trees from 2011 to 2016, 62 million of those during 2016 alone. The cause of the drought was attributed to a ridge of high pressure in the Pacific ocean—the "Ridiculously Resilient Ridge"—which often barred powerful winter storms from reaching the state.

By February 2017, the state's drought percentage returned to lower levels seen before the start of the drought. This change was due to an exceedingly wet pattern caused by atmospheric river-enhanced Pacific storms, which caused severe flooding.

In mid-March 2019, California was declared drought-free except for a small pocket of abnormally dry conditions in Southern California. This declaration followed a series of powerful Pacific storms during the first few months of the year, which coincided with the U.S. experiencing drought conditions in the fewest parts of the country since 2000.

== History ==
=== 2013 ===
In 2013, the total rainfall was less than 34% of what was expected. Many regions of the state accumulated less rainfall in 2013 than any other year on record. As a result of this, many fish species were threatened. Streams and rivers were so low that fish couldn't get to their spawning grounds, and survival rates of any eggs that were laid were expected to be low. Lack of rainfall had caused the mouths of rivers to be blocked off by sand bars which further prevented fish from reaching their spawning grounds. Stafford Lehr, Chief of Fisheries within the California Department of Fish and Wildlife said that 95% of winter run salmon did not survive in 2013.

Percent area in U.S. Drought Monitor categories (2014)

=== 2014 ===
According to the NOAA Drought Task Force report of 2014, the drought was not part of a long-term change in precipitation and was a symptom of the natural variability, although the record-high temperature that accompanied the recent drought may have been amplified due to the enhanced greenhouse effect; human-induced global warming. This was confirmed by a 2015 scientific study which estimated that global warming "accounted for 8–27% of the observed drought anomaly in 2012–2014... Although natural variability dominates, anthropogenic warming has substantially increased the overall likelihood of extreme California droughts."

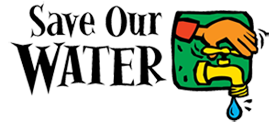
Logo of the Save Our Water campaign

By February 1, 2014, Felicia Marcus, the chairwoman of the State Water Resources Control Board, claimed the 2014 drought "is the most serious drought we've faced in modern times." Marcus argues that California needs to "conserve what little we have to use later in the year, or even in future years." Pritchett & Manning 2009 showed that the alkali meadow vegetation plant community is groundwater dependent and that this characteristic buffers the system from the effects of drought. This means that certain plants are actually able to help prevent droughts, but can only do so if groundwater is maintained at a certain level. One of the reasons that the study was conducted was to ascertain whether the Owens Valley region of California could handle any practiced or proposed groundwater extraction.

In February 2014, the Californian drought reached for the first time in the 54-year history of the State Water Project to shortages of water supplies. The California Department of Water Resources planned to reduce water allocations to farmland by 50%. California's 38 million residents experienced 13 consecutive months of drought. This is particularly an issue for the state's 44.7 billion dollar agricultural industry, which produces nearly half of all U.S.-grown fruits, nuts, and vegetables. This is after the LADWP expected to increase the pumping of aquifers to about 1.36×10^{8} m^{3} a year (City of Los Angeles and County of Inyo 1991) but the United States Geological Survey (USGS) reported that a sustainable pumping rate is a third lower, at around 8.64×10^{7} m^{3} a year (Danskin 1998).

According to NASA, tests published in January 2014 have shown that the twelve months prior to January 2014 were the driest on record, since record-keeping began in 1885. In mid-May 2014, the US Drought Monitor analysis showed that 100% of California was already under "Severe Drought" or a higher level. The 2014 drought is considered the worst in 1,200 years. As California received additional rainfall in December 2014, this was not expected to end California's drought, and trees were at risk due to weakened roots. Experts also noted that due to the soil's extreme dryness and low groundwater levels, it would take significantly more rain—at least five more similar storms—to end the drought. On December 18, it was revealed that almost all of the Exceptional Drought in Northern California had been reduced to Extreme Drought severity, as a result of the winter storms that brought rain to California during December.

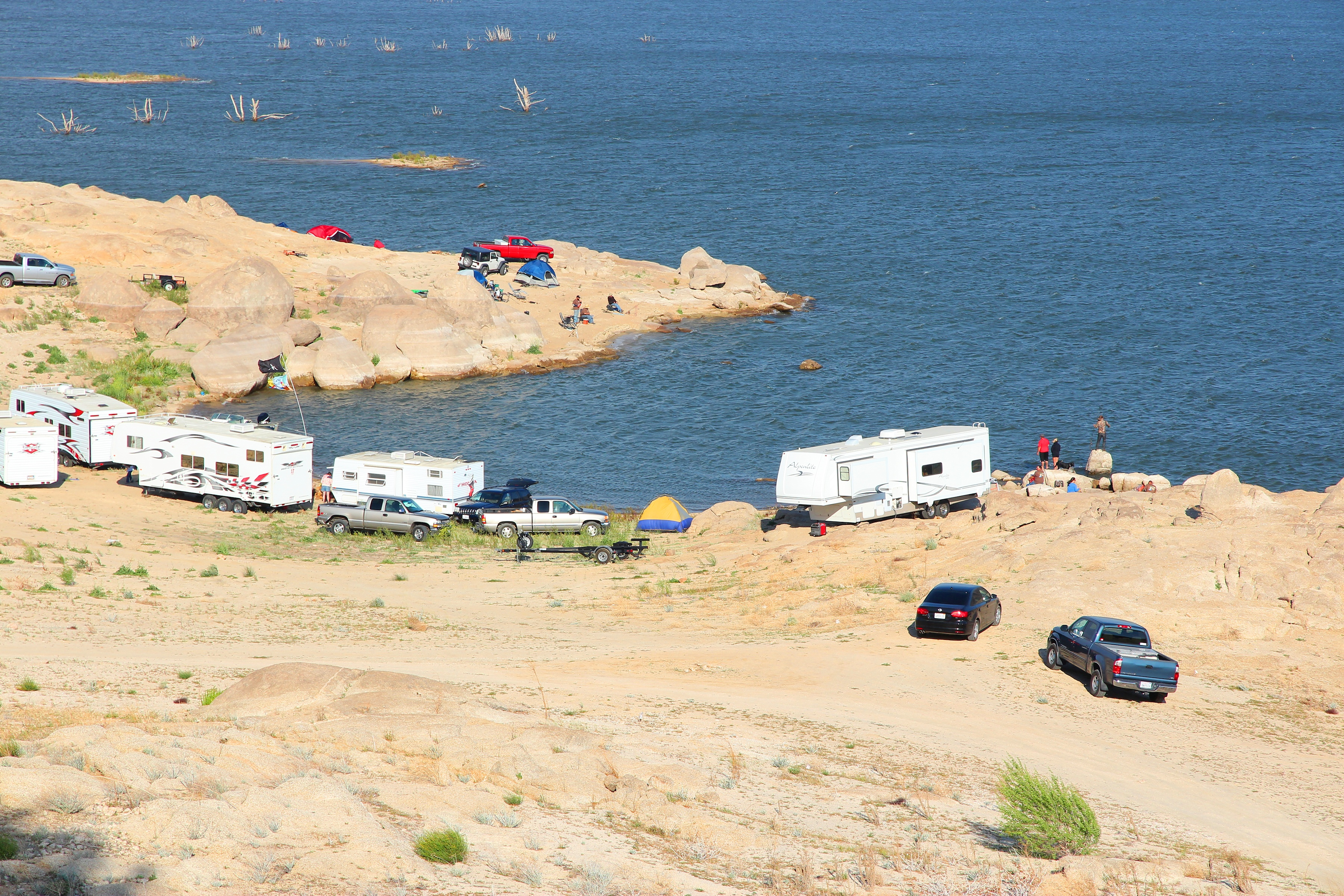
Low level of Lake Isabella in Kern County

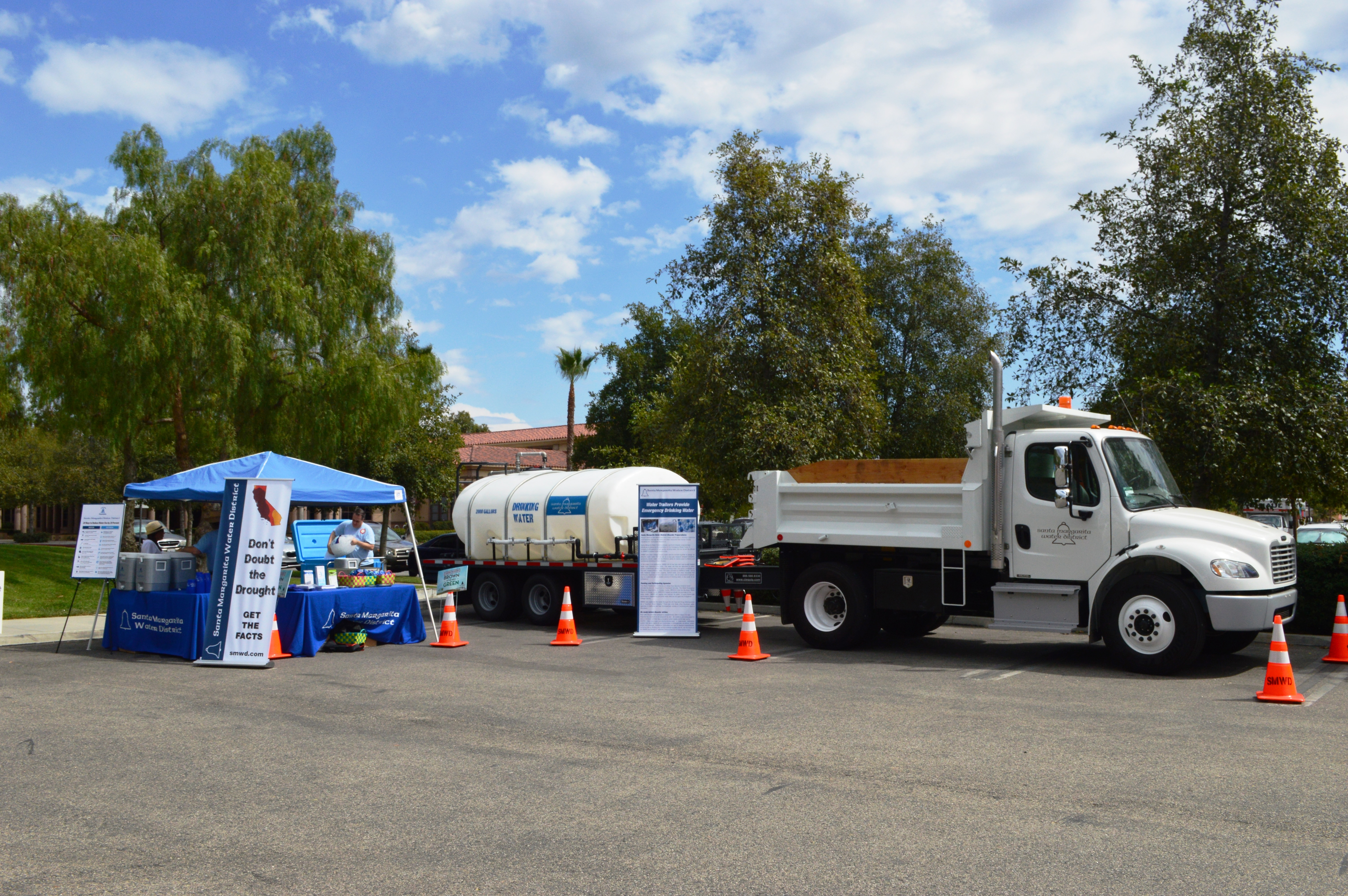
A Santa Margarita Water District booth promoting water conservation

In 2014, a study by the UC California Institute for Water Resources was released which found that rainfall has been abnormally high since the late 1800s. According to Professor Scott Stine from Cal State East Bay, California experienced its wettest period in seven thousand years during the 20th century, according to his study of tree stumps around Mono Lake, Tenaya Lake and other parts of the Sierra Nevada. Stine was quoted as saying in the National Geographic Magazine, "What we have come to consider normal is profoundly wet". This view was backed by Lynn Ingram of University of California, Berkeley, and Glen MacDonald of UCLA.

Lack of water due to low snowpack prompted Californian governor Jerry Brown to order a series of stringent mandatory water restrictions on April 1, 2015. Brown ordered cities and towns to reduce their water usage by 25%, which would amount in 1.5 million acre-feet of water in the nine months following the mandate in April. However, Brown's water restrictions were criticized because they were not applied to California's agricultural sector, which uses around 80% of California's developed water supply.

The California Department of Fish and Wildlife closed dozens of streams and rivers to fishing in 2014. Lehr has said that he fears coho salmon may go completely extinct south of the Golden Gate Bridge in the near future. In early 2014 the main stems of the Eel, Mad, Smith, Van Duzen, and Mattole rivers were closed pending additional rainfall. Large areas of the Russian and American rivers were closed indefinitely. Most rivers in San Mateo, Santa Cruz and Monterey counties were also closed pending further rainfall. Other actions were also taken, such as releasing more water from the Kent Dam in hopes of raising the levels in the Lagunitas Creek watershed—one of the last spawning grounds that wild coho can still reach.

Protesters said that banning fishing would disrupt the economy and threaten the livelihoods of individuals who rely on salmon fishing during the winters. Officials, however, highlighted that it would help prevent species that are already in trouble from slipping to extinction.

=== 2015 ===
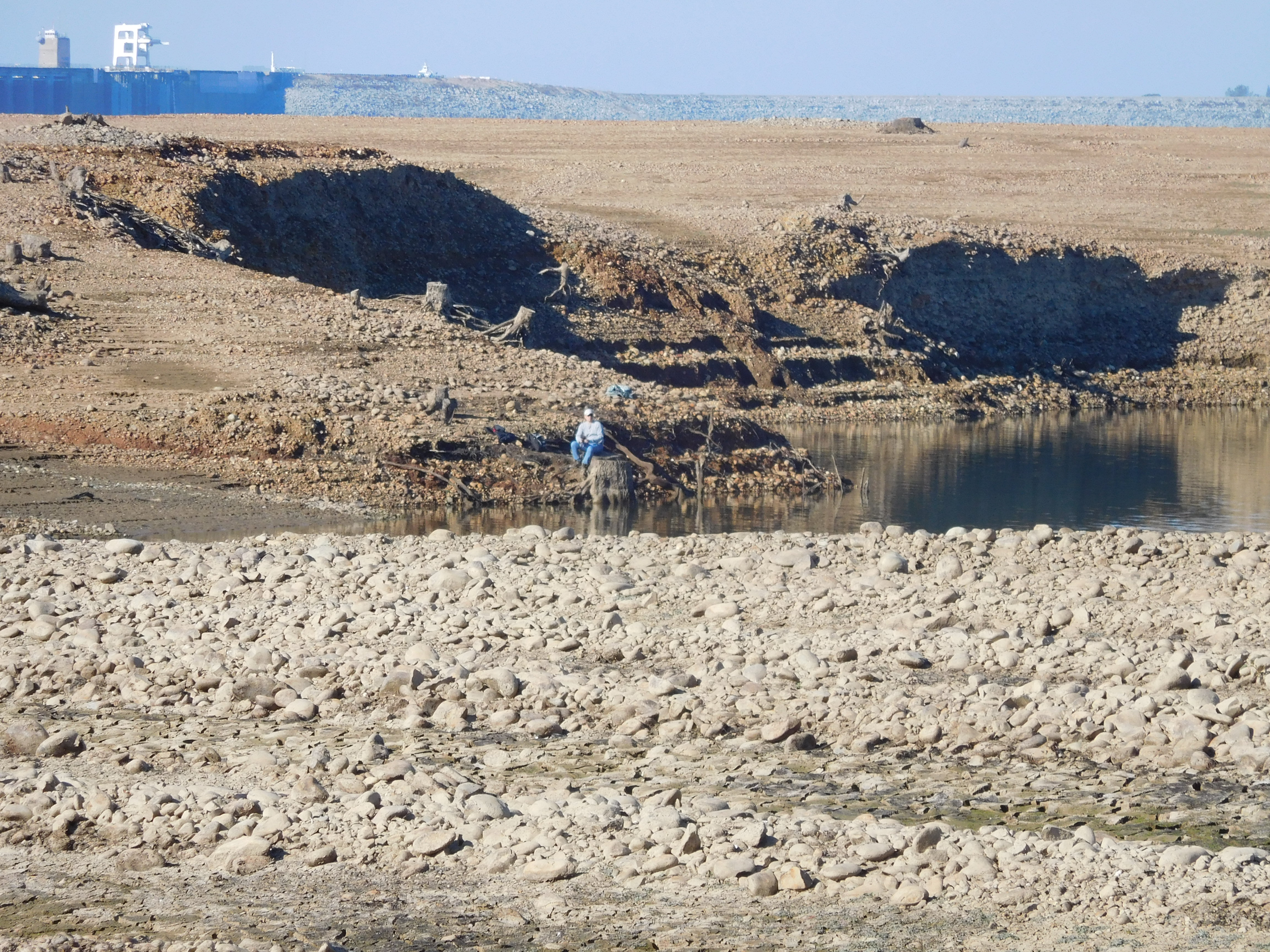
Folsom Lake reservoir in 2015

In May 2015, a state resident poll conducted by Field Poll found that two out of three respondents agreed that it should be mandated for water agencies to reduce water consumption by 25%.

The 2015 prediction of El Niño to bring rains to California raised hopes of ending the drought. In the spring of 2015, the National Oceanic and Atmospheric Administration named the probability of the presence of El Niño conditions until the end of 2015 at 80%. Historically, sixteen winters between 1951 and 2015 had created El Niño. Six of those had below-average rainfall, five had average rainfall, and five had above-average rainfall. However, as of May 2015, drought conditions had worsened and above average ocean temperatures had not resulted in large storms.

The drought led to Governor Jerry Brown's instituting mandatory 25 percent water restrictions in June 2015.

In response to heightening drought conditions, California tightened fishing restrictions in many areas of the state. Streams and rivers on the northern coast had unprecedented amounts of fishing bans. In February 2015, the California Fish and Game Commission voted unanimously to further tighten regulations on both recreational and commercial fishing, and the U.S. Endangered Species Act listed steelhead as threatened and coho salmon as endangered.

=== 2016 ===
Many millions of California trees died from the drought—approximately 102 million, including 62 million in 2016 alone. By the end of 2016, 30% of California had emerged from the drought, mainly in the northern half of the state, while 40% of the state remained in the extreme or exceptional drought levels.

=== 2017 ===
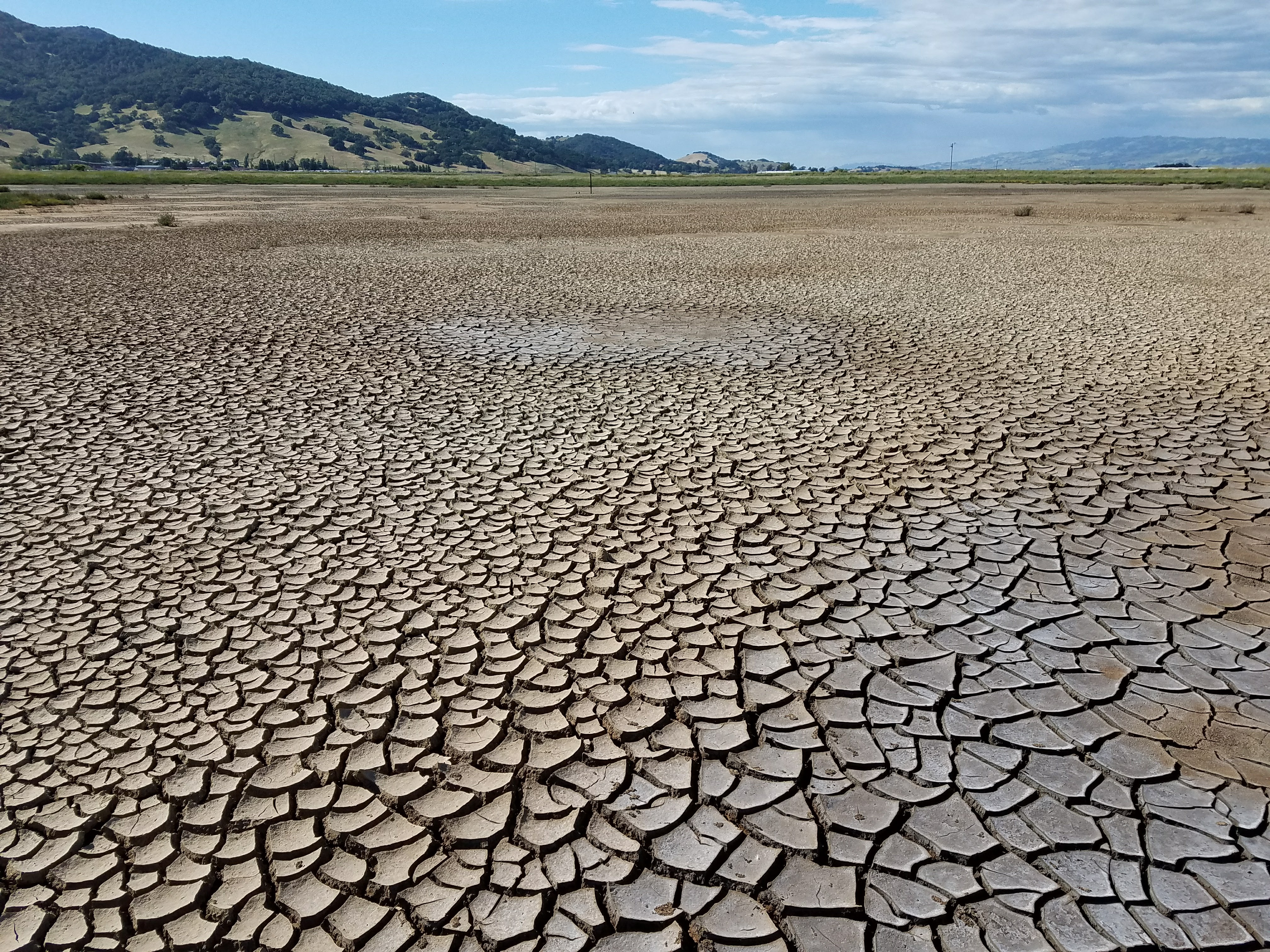
Dried lakebed in Novato around the end of the 2011-2017 California drought

Heavy rains in January 2017 had significant benefit to the state's northern water reserves, despite widespread power outages and erosion damage in the wake of the deluge. Among the casualties of the rain was the 1,000 year-old Pioneer Cabin Tree in Calaveras Big Trees State Park, which toppled on January 8, 2017.

The drought was largely alleviated in California by a persistent weather pattern that allowed rounds of storm systems to consistently hammer the state, with the snowpack rising to well above average. By January 24, 2017, not one portion of the state was in "Exceptional" drought, the highest category on the Drought Monitor. On February 21, no part of the state was in the next-lower category of "Extreme" drought, and over 60% of the state's area was no longer in any level of drought.

A record year of precipitation in California brought the state out of the bad situation and more or less back to equilibrium. Unexpectedly, this occurred during a La Niña winter; California typically benefits from the El Niño winters, which were occurring in the recent previous years.

On April 7, 2017, Governor Jerry Brown declared the drought over. However, according to the United States Drought Monitor, the state was not entirely drought-free until March 12, 2019. The 2020–2023 drought began the next year.

== Mitigation ==
Beginning in 2008, millions of floating plastic shade balls were dropped on reservoirs to prevent evaporative losses and enhance water quality. An instance of this was performed on the Los Angeles reservoir in 2014. The shade balls were supposed to be the most cost-effective way to cover the body of water amongst all the available options. One of the concerns with this method, however, was the amount of water required to make the shade balls themselves. Scientists determined that the amount of time that the shade balls need to be deployed for the water costs in production to be balanced is between one and two and a half years. In 2018 the PBS News Hour reviewed the use of the balls, stating that since their deployment in 2014 the shade balls should have surpassed their water cost in the water they have saved.

=== Long-term mitigation ===
Voters' approval of the Proposition 1 water bond in 2014 has been interpreted as an eagerness to add flexibility to California's water system. The 2014 Proposition 1 allocated almost 8 million dollars towards various projects related to the conservation and quality of California's water. The money was supposed to be divided into various categories to distribute the improvement of the state's entire water system. Four years after this passed, only about 80 percent of the budget has been spent on the improvements laid out in the bill.

In early 2016, Los Angeles County began a proactive cloud-seeding program. Cloud-seeding is the process of emitting specific chemicals into the sky usually from the ground or a plane. This is supposed to create an environment with increased rainfall given certain prerequisite weather conditions. Even though many Americans find this process to be almost superstitious, there is science to support its legitimacy. However, rainfall studies have shown rainfall to improve by around 5 to 15 percent in optimal weather conditions. The issue at hand is whether or not the cost of the operation is worth it with the amount of improvement and the reliability.

As of June 2023, California's Department of Water Resources (DWR) has awarded over $70 million in an attempt to mitigate and help with local drought impacts as well as $217 million awarded to 44 projects that aim to help strengthen and prepare communities to be more resilient and prepared for the impacts of long term drought.

== See also ==
- 2012–2013 North American drought
- 2020–2023 North American drought
- Droughts in California
- Climate change in California
- North Pacific High
