= Vanessa Diffenbaugh =

American novelist

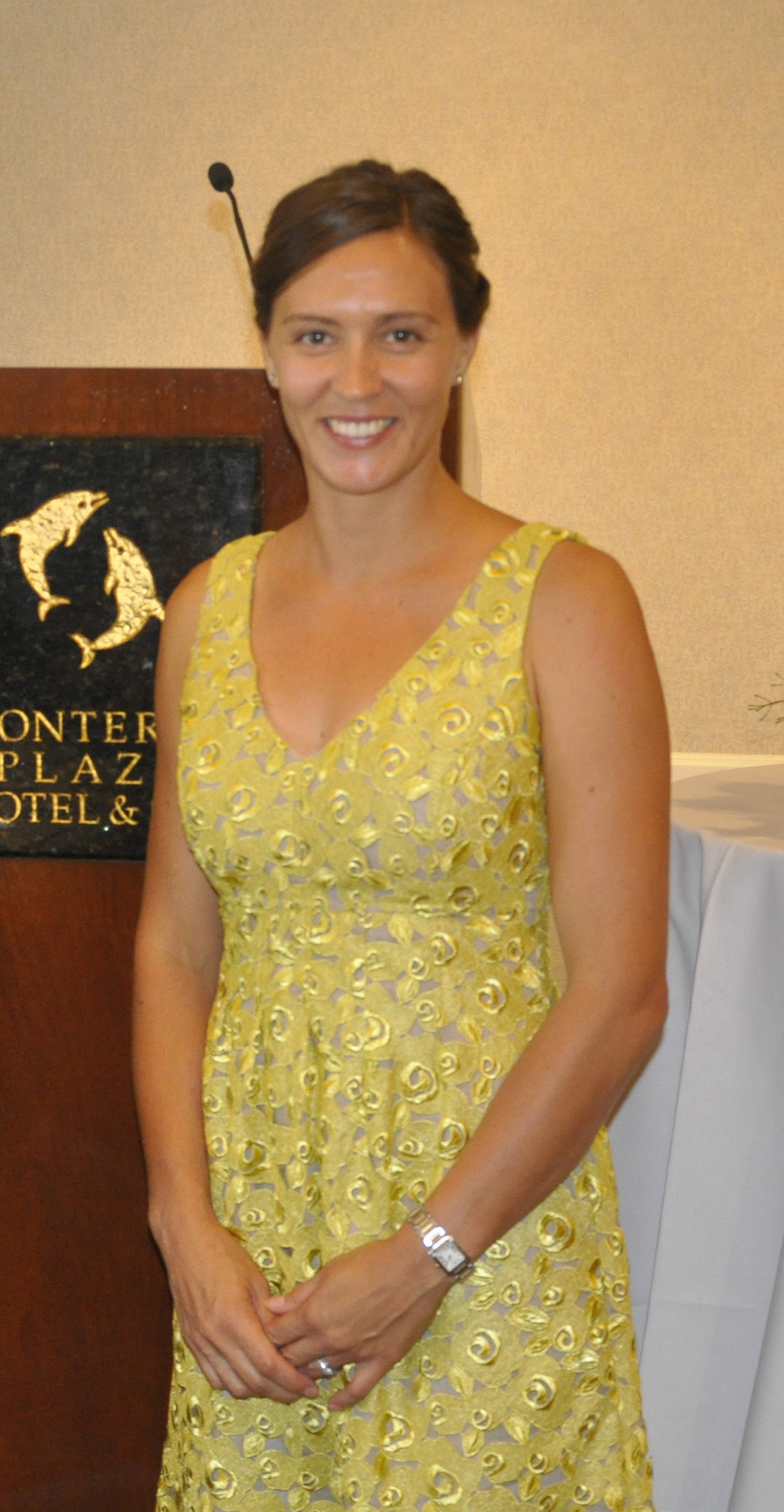
- Born: 1978 (age 47–48); San Francisco, California, U.S.
- Education: Stanford University
- Spouse: PK Diffenbaugh
- Website: vanessadiffenbaugh.com

Vanessa Diffenbaugh (born 1978) is the American author of the novel The Language of Flowers and the nonfiction A Victorian Flower Dictionary.

== Biography ==
Diffenbaugh was born in San Francisco and raised in Chico, California. After studying creative writing and education at Stanford, she went on to teach art and writing to youth in low-income communities.

During her time at Stanford, she began mentoring two sisters. The sisters were placed into Diffenbaugh's custody at age 23, but unable to care for them surrendered them to the foster care system. The experience inspired Diffenbaugh and her husband to become foster care parents in 2007. In 2010, she founded of the Camellia Network, a nonprofit organization intended to create a nationwide movement to support youth transitioning from foster care. In 2015, the network was acquired by the non-profit Youth Villages.

Her 2011 book, The Language of Flowers, stayed 69 weeks on the New York Times’ best-seller list and was translated into 42 languages. The novel follows the fraught life of Victoria Jones, who by the age of 18, had lived in 32 foster homes, and becomes a flower arranger. The novel was inspired by a flower dictionary, a type of Victorian-era book which defines what different types of flowers mean. She also published a new non-fiction A Victorian Flower Dictionary to accompany the novel. In 2019, it was announced there will be a film adaptation of the novel starring Nick Robinson and Kiersey Clemons.

In 2014, Diffenbaugh and her family moved to Monterey, California from Cambridge, Massachusetts.

In 2015, Diffenbaugh published her second novel, We Never Asked for Wings.

== Bibliography ==
- The Language of Flowers (2011)
- A Victorian Flower Dictionary: The Language of Flowers Companion (2011)
- We Never Asked for Wings (2015)
