= 2009–10 North American winter =

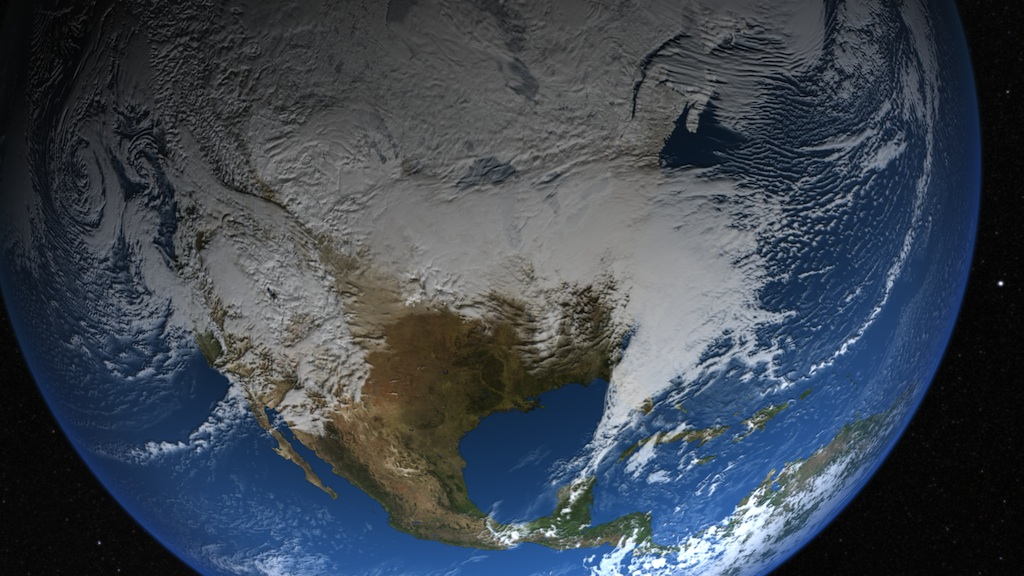
- Visualization by NASA of the first of 3 blizzards to impact the Northeast in early February 2010.

Seasonal boundaries
- Meteorological winter: December 1 – February 28
- Astronomical winter: December 21 – March 20
- First event started: October 3, 2009
- Last event concluded: April 30, 2010

Most notable event
- Name: 2009 North American Christmas blizzard
  - Duration: December 22–28, 2009
  - Lowest pressure: 985 mb (29.09 inHg)
  - Fatalities: 21 total
  - Damage: Unknown (2009 USD)

Seasonal statistics
- Total WPC-issued storms: 20 total (Note: Includes Nor'Ida)
- Rated storms (RSI) (Cat. 1+): 17 total
- Major storms (RSI) (Cat. 3+): 6 total
- Maximum snowfall accumulation: 90 in (230 cm) in Mammoth Mountain Ski Area, California (January 17–22, 2010)
- Maximum ice accretion: 0.3 in (7.6 mm) in Irondale, Alabama (February 8–12, 2010)
- Total fatalities: 108 total
- Total damage: > $3.086 billion (2010 USD)

Related articles
- Weather of 2009; Winter of 2009–10 in Europe

The 2009–10 North American winter was one of the most active and prolific winter seasons on record in the United States and North America as a whole, and the most severe since the 1995–96 winter. Multiple winter storms and widespread arctic blasts throughout the winter led to an expansive snow cover, with the Weather Prediction Center (WPC) issuing summaries on a total of 20 significant winter weather events. None other that saw the most impacts was the Northeast and Mid-Atlantic states; from mid-December to the end of February, the region saw four blizzards affect a majority of the states, three of which occurred within the month of February alone. Those three storms pushed cities such as Washington D.C., Baltimore, Philadelphia and New York City to one of, if not the snowiest February on record. The winter also saw a prolific amount of winter storms rated on the Regional Snowfall Index (RSI) scale, with 17 such storms, and 6 of those storms further achieving a ranking of Category 3 or higher. A moderate-to-strong El Niño influenced the majority of the weather patterns during the winter, especially in the second half.

Other major winter weather events during the season also included a powerful West Coast storm in mid-October and a wide-ranging and crippling blizzard that struck the central U.S. on Christmas Eve and Christmas Day, spreading snow and blizzard conditions from Oklahoma to the Canada–United States border; it was also the first to be rated a Category 5 on the RSI scale since the January 1996 United States blizzard. In January, a a parade of storms caused significant impacts to the West Coast in addition to British Columbia in Canada. Additionally, a crippling Category 4 winter storm affected the southern half of the U.S. in mid-February, leading to record snow cover in those areas. Collectively, the winter storms and related weather caused at least $3.08 billion in damages and 108 fatalities, most of the deaths coming from the February 5–6 blizzard.

While there is no well-agreed-upon date used to indicate the start of winter in the Northern Hemisphere, there are two definitions of winter which may be used. Based on the astronomical definition, winter begins at the winter solstice, which in 2009 occurred on December 21, and ends at the March equinox, which in 2010 occurred on March 20. Based on the meteorological definition, the first day of winter is December 1 and the last day February 28. Both definitions involve a period of approximately three months, with some variability.

== Seasonal forecasts ==
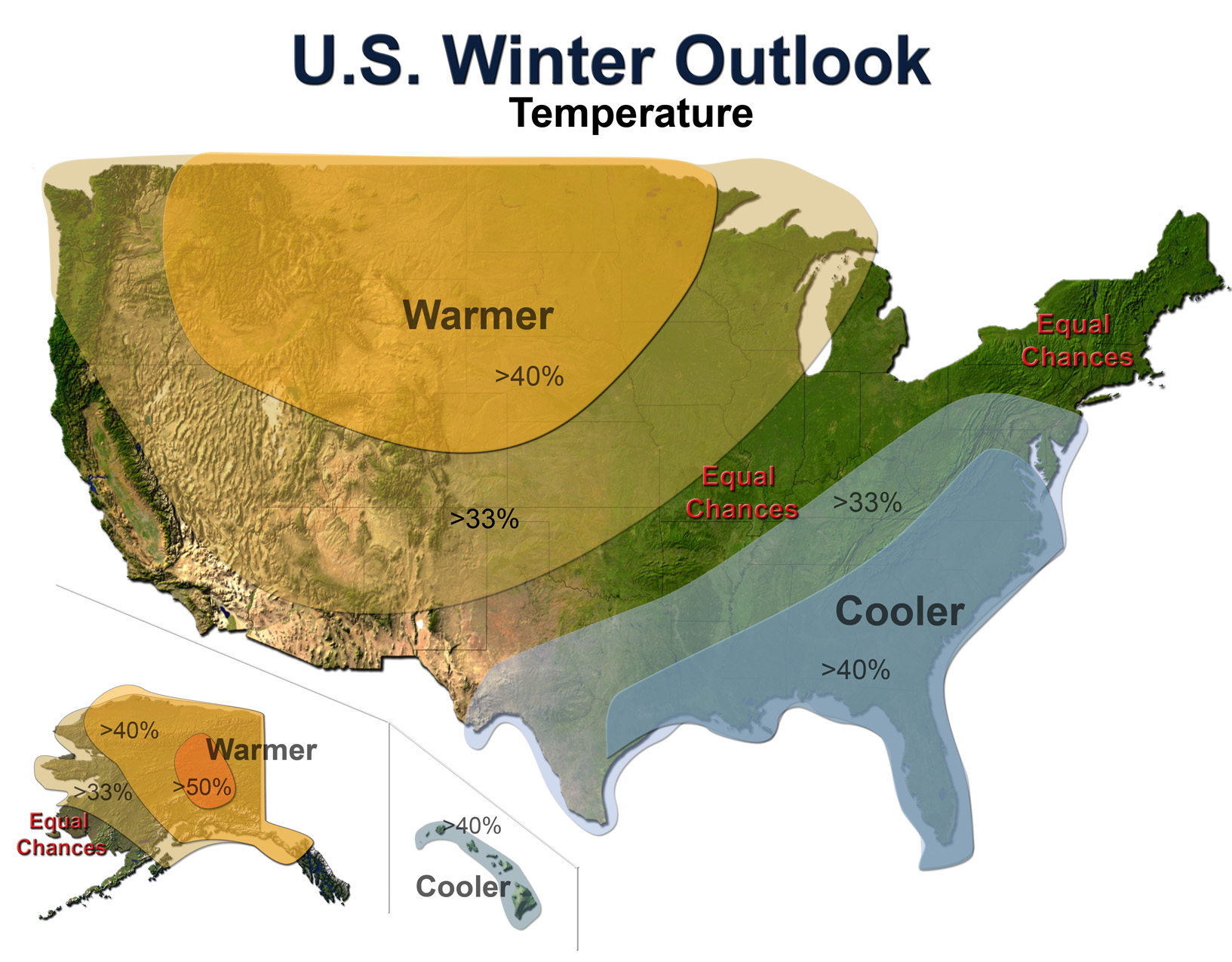
Temperature outlook

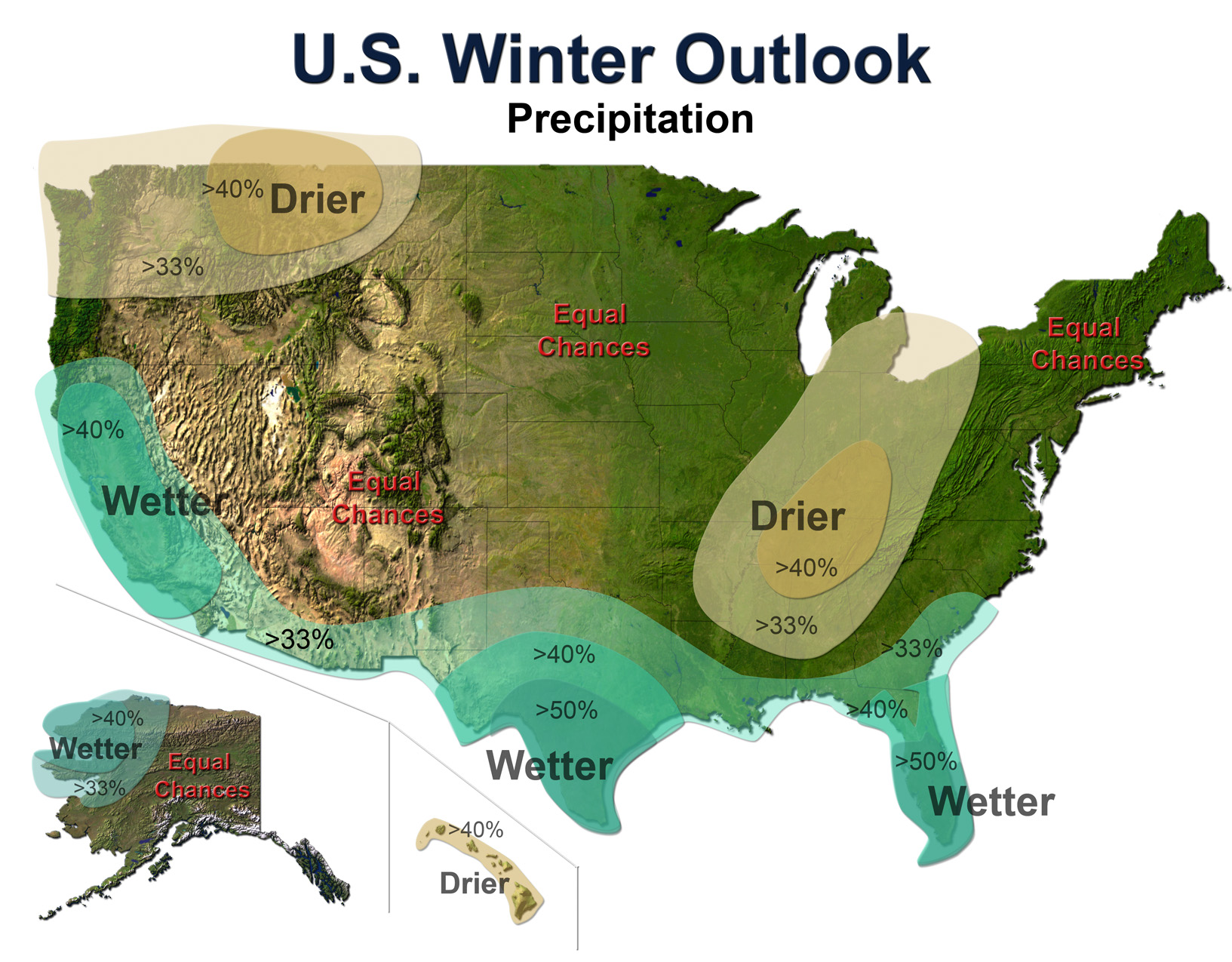
Precipitation outlook

On October 15, 2009, the National Oceanic and Atmospheric Administration's Climate Prediction Center issued its U.S. Winter Outlook. Due to a strengthening El Niño, winter weather was expected to be affected by this. Warmer-than-average temperatures were favored across much of the western and central U.S., especially in the north-central states from Montana to Wisconsin. Below-average temperatures were expected across the Southeast and mid-Atlantic from southern and eastern Texas to southern Pennsylvania and south through Florida. Above-average precipitation is expected in the southern border states, especially Texas and Florida. Recent rainfall and the prospects of more should improve current drought conditions in central and southern Texas. The rest of the country fell into the equal-chance zone.

== Seasonal summary ==
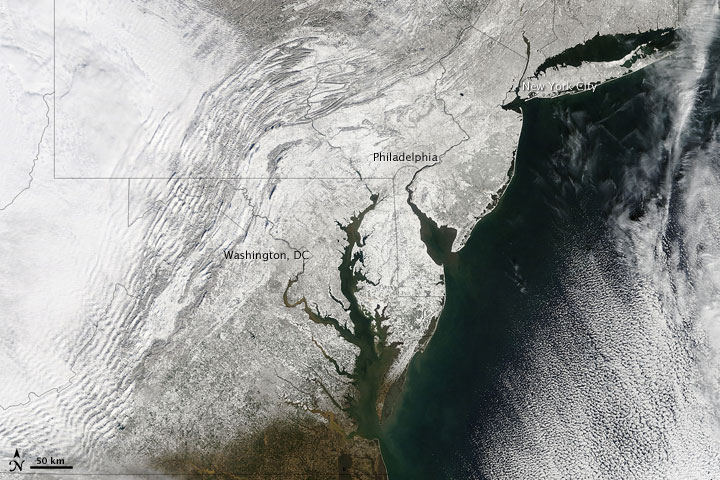
The entirety of the Mid-Atlantic states covered with snow on February 11 after two consecutive blizzards struck the region just days apart

The winter of 2009–10 was one of the most severe winter seasons on record for North America, with significant winter storms and arctic outbreaks of bitterly cold temperatures. affecting the majority of the continent and the United States during the majority of the winter months. At one point during the winter, on February 18, all of the Lower 48 had snowfall on the ground, signifying the extremity of the amount of major winter storms that occurred in a short period of time across the U.S. The extreme activity was also indicated by the high amount of storms rated on the Regional Snowfall Index (RSI); a total of 17 storms were rated on the scale, 6 of which were rated at or above a Category 3 on the scale. The ongoing 2009–10 El Niño event was responsible for the overall winter weather pattern, leading to many blockbuster snowstorms across the eastern half of the country. The season overall opened with a snowstorm in the Rocky Mountains at the start of October, before a major storm system, partially attributed to the remnants of Typhoon Melor, affected the Western United States by mid-month starting on October 13. November did not feature much activity, aside from the remnants of Hurricane Ida becoming a nor'easter that affected the Mid-Atlantic region mid-month, causing significant damage and heavy rainfall. Additionally, snow cover across the contgiuous U.S. was well-below average for the month of November, with temperatures mostly above average.

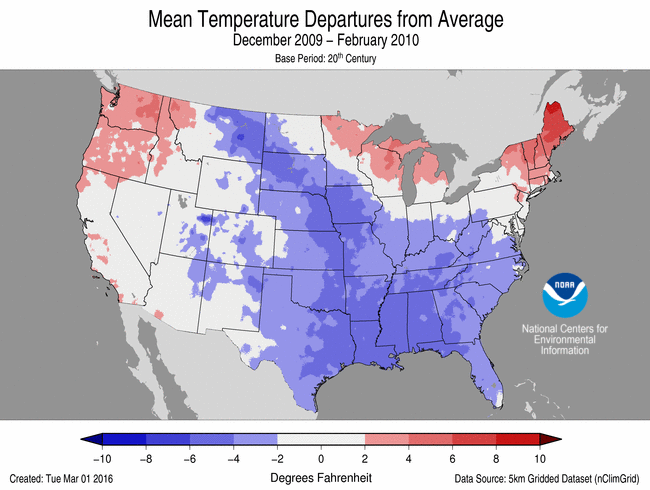
Average temperature anomalies in the United States during the 2009–10 winter.

December saw a major pattern shift as winter weather events kicked into high gear, precipitated by the negative phases of the North Atlantic Oscillation (NAO) and Arctic Oscillation (AO), which favor colder temperatures and more favorable winter storm tracks. Temperatures overall during the month of December were below-average as multiple outbreaks of cold temperatures affected the U.S.; the month ended with temperatures 3.2 °F (1.78 °C) colder than the long-term average nationally, with the coldest temperatures towards the central part of the country. A major winter storm affected regions from the Rocky Mountains to the Great Lakes from December 7–11, causing significant impacts. Only a week later on December 19, the first high-impact and major snowstorm for the eastern U.S. occurred, as a powerful blizzard buried the Northeastern United States under 12–24 in (30–61 cm) of snow and killing 7. Shortly afterwards, on Christmas Eve, most of the Central United States were struck by an extremely large and widespread blizzard and storm complex that produced heavy snowfall and blizzard conditions from Texas and Oklahoma all the way north towards the Canada–United States border; the storm was rated a category 5 on the RSI, the first since the January 1996 blizzard. On Christmas Day, approximately 63% of the Contiguous United States had snow on the ground and constituting a "white Christmas", the most expansive snow cover since 2003; New York City and Philadelphia would not see another white Christmas after this winter until 2024. The last few days of 2009 into the beginning of 2010 saw another nor'easter affect regions from the Great Lakes to New England.

== Events ==
=== October West Coast cyclone ===
- Category 0 "Nuisance" (RSI/NOAA: N/A)
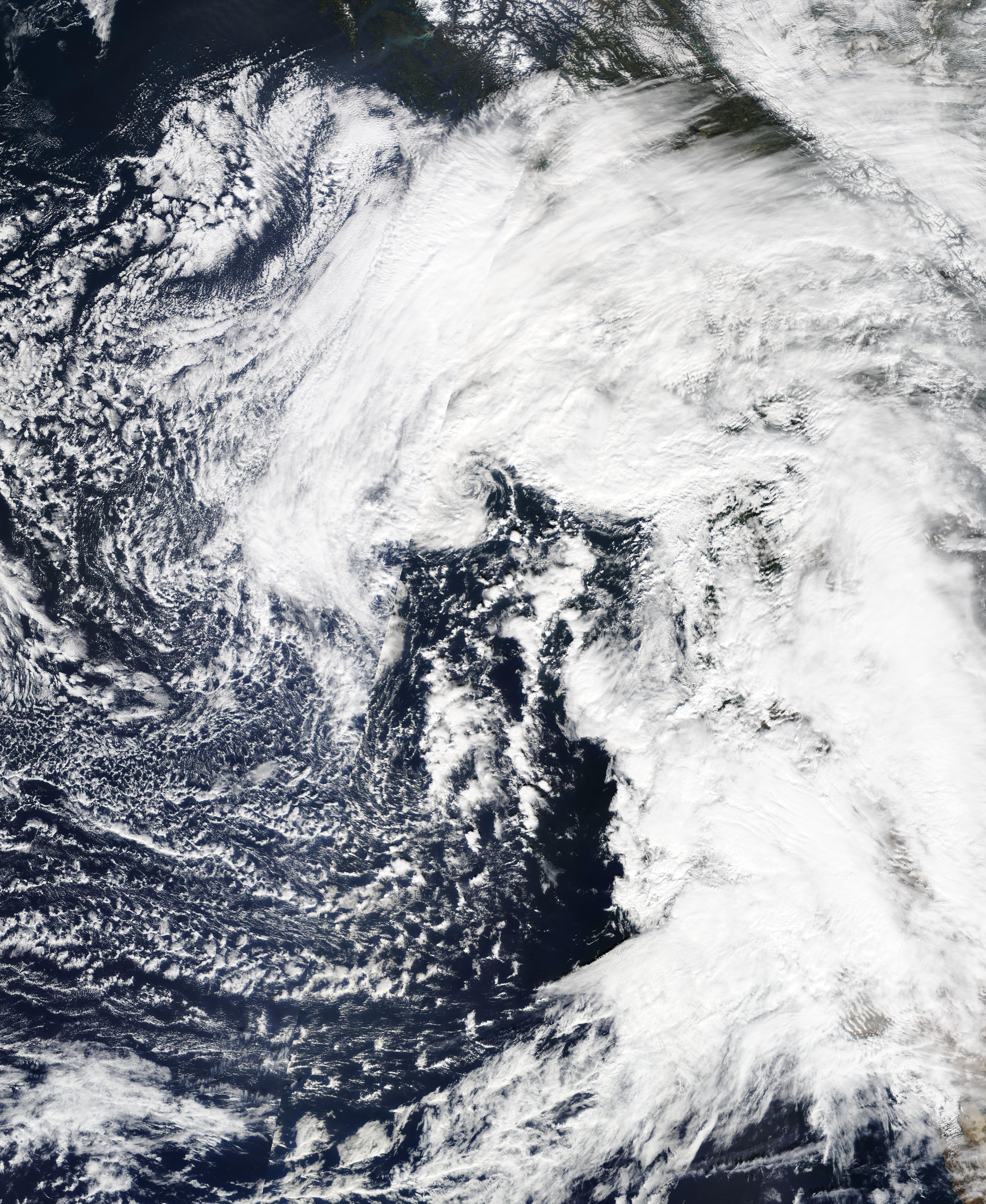
- Duration: October 13 – October 15, 2009
- Lowest pressure: 966 mb (28.53 inHg)
- Maximum snow: 23 in (58 cm)
- Fatalities: 2 fatalities
- Damage: $8.861 million (2009 USD)

A significant storm, partially attributed to the remnants of Typhoon Melor began to impact the West Coast of the United States, beginning very early on October 13. Around the same time, an atmospheric river opened up (the Pineapple Express), channeling large amounts of moisture into the storm, resulting in heavy rainfall across California and other parts of the Western United States. The storm caused at least $8.861 million (2009 USD) in damages across the West Coast of the United States.

=== Ex-Hurricane Ida ("Nor'Ida") ===
- Category 0 "Nuisance" (RSI/NOAA: N/A)
- Duration: November 11 – November 17, 2009
- Lowest pressure: 992 mb (29.29 inHg)
- Fatalities: 2 fatalities
- Damage: $277.8 million (2009 USD)

The mid-level circulation of Hurricane Ida's remnants led to the formation of a new low over southeastern Georgia, which eventually moved off the coast of North Carolina. This new low quickly intensified and became a powerful nor'easter that caused substantial damage throughout the Mid-Atlantic States. Convective banding features became increasingly defined throughout the day, Due to the rapid succession of these systems, United States media referred to the nor'easter as "Nor'Ida". By November 12, the system attained a minimum pressure of 992 mbar (hPa; 29.29 inHg) along with winds of 65 mph (105 km/h). In combination with a large area of high pressure, a long stretch of easterly, onshore winds impacted areas from Virginia to southern New England. Tracking parallel to the North Carolina coastline, the system eventually moved onshore near Cape Hatteras by November 13. Due to the high-pressure system situated over Vermont, the low turned southeastward, bringing its center back over water. Gradual weakening took place during this period, though heavy rains continued to fall across much of the Chesapeake Bay area. On November 14, a brief secondary low developed within the system, off the coast of Delaware. Continuing to weaken, the cyclone resumed a northward track after the high weakened and persisted through November 17, by which time it had moved over Atlantic Canada.

=== Early December winter storm ===
- Category 3 "Major" (RSI/NOAA: 8.397)
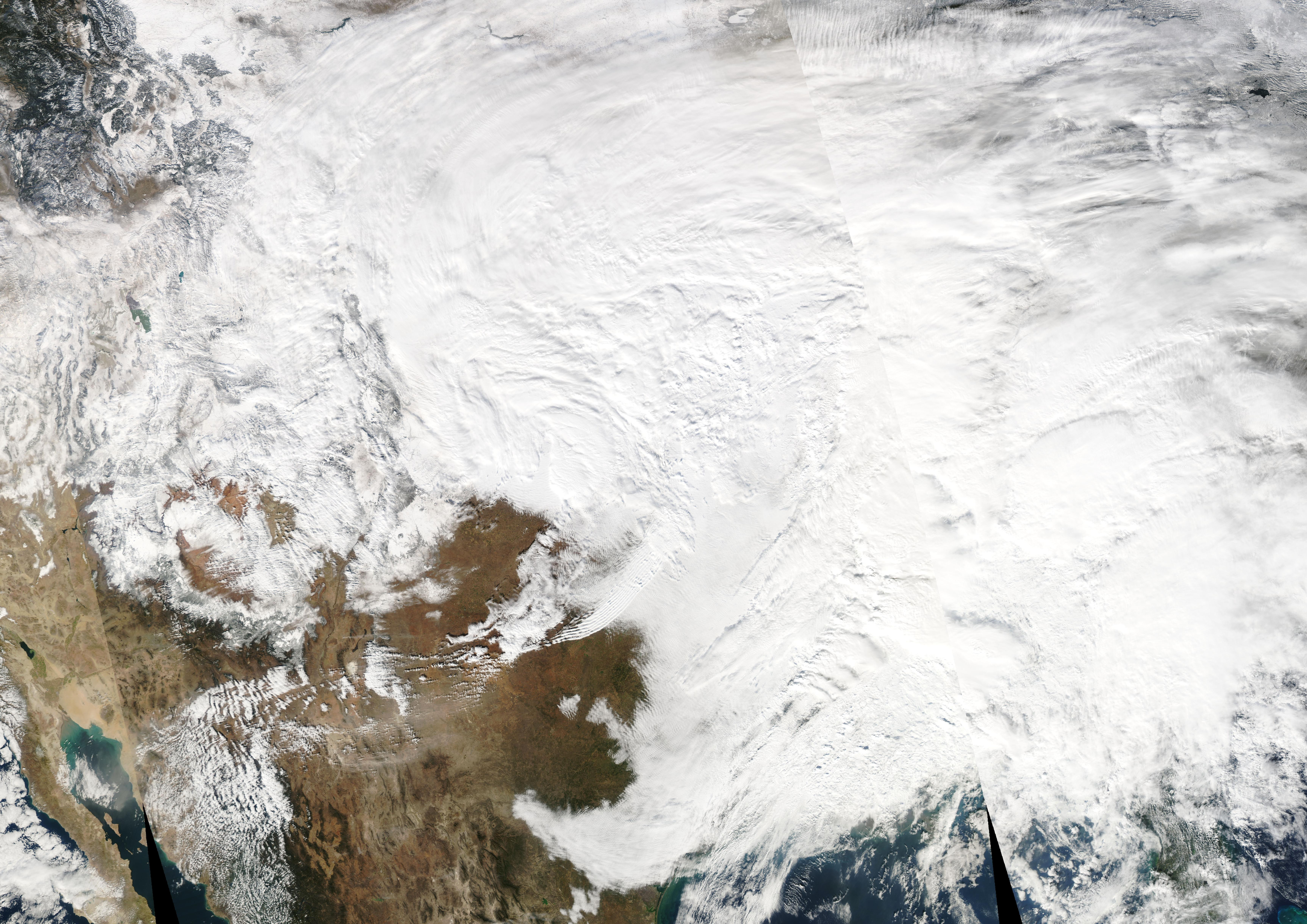
- Duration: December 7 – December 11, 2009
- Lowest pressure: 974 mb (28.76 inHg)
- Maximum snow: 48 in (120 cm)
- Fatalities: 16 fatalities

A major winter storm in early December brought record amounts of snow to the Midwest and contributed to deaths of 16 people. The storms affected a number of US states, including Arizona, Wisconsin and New York, as well as Canada. Although the initial storm had virtually subsided by December 11, further snow was expected to fall.

A weak disturbance that started overnight on December 6 stalled over the western United States and intensified rapidly. Heavy downpours began early in the morning of December 7 and continued non-stop until the evening, triggering flash-flood watches. The storm dropped as much as 4.5 in (110 mm) of rain in Cuyamaca, San Diego, causing blackouts in some locations. This storm was followed by a small semi-tropical winter storm which started overnight on December 10 and then stalled over Southern California and intensified, causing heavy downpours. In addition to 4 inches (100 mm) of rain, this storm gave pea-sized-hail and gusty winds before weakening and moving away from Southern California on December 13. Heavy snow hit Wisconsin, New York, Washington, D.C., and parts of Maryland on the 10th and 14th. Heavy rain hit parts of Arizona on the 11th. In Vancouver, BC a strong winter storm deposited anywhere from 10 to 30 cm of heavy snow from the night of the 12th through to the morning of the 15th after a frigid arctic air that had been over the region for days with as low as -15 °C temperatures met with moist Pacific air.

=== Mid-December blizzard ===
- Category 4 "Crippling" (RSI/NOAA: 12.78)
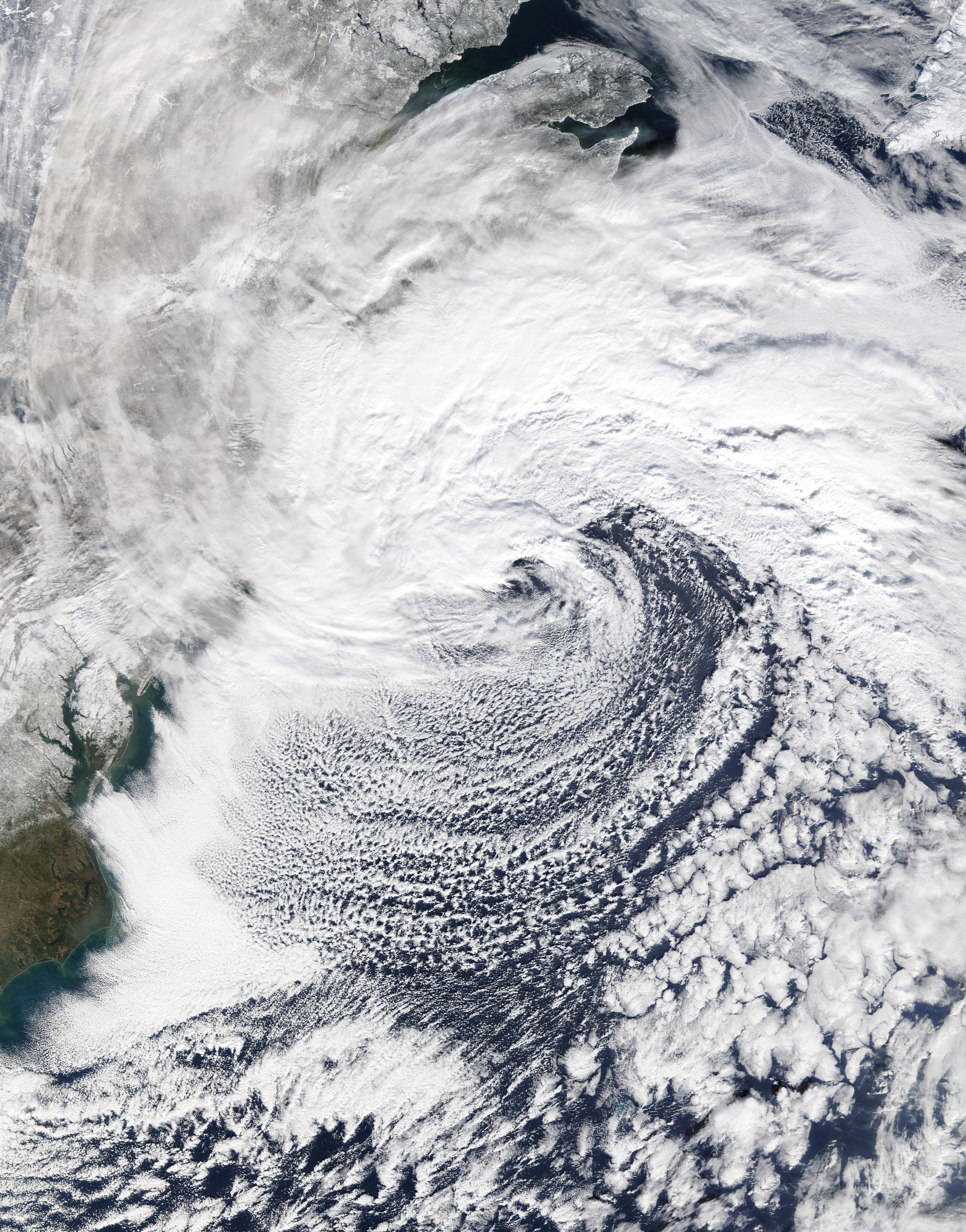
- Duration: December 18 – December 21, 2009
- Lowest pressure: 968 mb (28.59 inHg)
- Maximum snow: 26.3 in (67 cm)
- Fatalities: 7 fatalities

On December 16, meteorologists identified a storm forming in the Gulf of Mexico. It produced record rainfall in regions of Texas and had the potential to strengthen as it moved through Georgia and Florida and further north. Weather models accurately predicted that this storm would meet with cold air while retaining its heavy precipitation. By the afternoon of December 19, the large, low pressure region had moved off the East Coast, intensifying and bringing heavy snow to the major Mid-Atlantic cities. Blizzard warnings were issued in Washington, D.C., Baltimore, and Long Island. As the storm moved northward along the East coast, at one point it measured 500 miles (800 km) across 14 states. The storm produced whiteout conditions and dumped about 16–20 inches (41–51 cm) of snow in major cities along the Eastern seaboard.

Some regions affected by the storm experienced winds up to 25–30 miles per hour (40–48 km/h) with gusts of 45–50 miles per hour (72–80 km/h). Ronald Reagan Washington National Airport, Washington Dulles International Airport, and Baltimore/Washington International Thurgood Marshall Airport saw whiteout conditions, causing flights to be delayed or canceled. Of 740 scheduled departures at Washington National and 530 at Dulles, only 14 and 12, respectively, were able to take off. President Barack Obama, arriving at Andrews Air Force Base after the UN Climate Conference, was forced to return to the White House by motorcade instead of helicopter. More than 800 flights were canceled at New York City's three major airports. Delays averaged over six hours at Philadelphia International Airport.

=== Christmas Eve storm complex ===
- Category 5 "Extreme" (RSI/NOAA: 19.62)
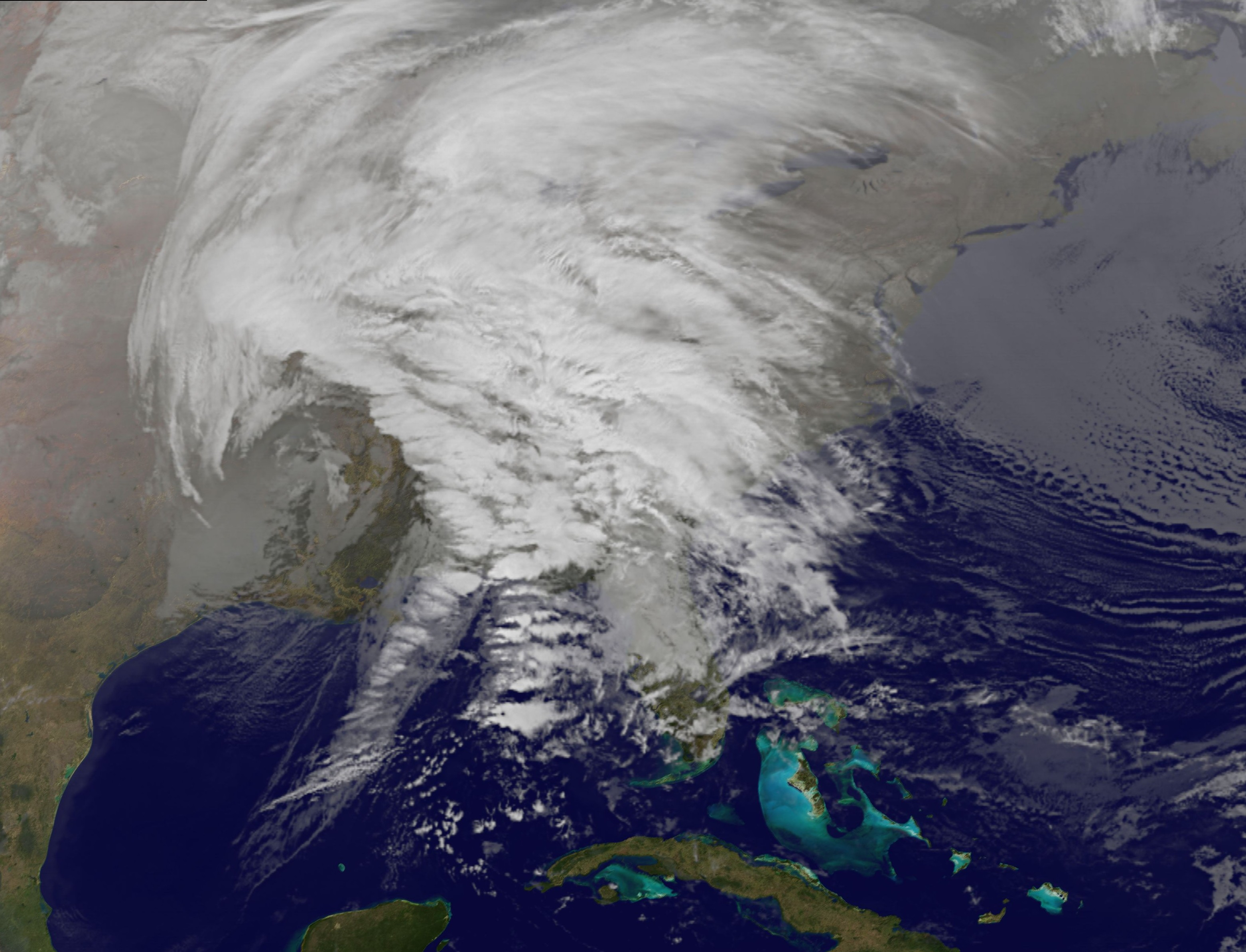
- Duration: December 22 – December 28, 2009
- Lowest pressure: 985 mb (29.09 inHg)
- Maximum snow: 40 in (100 cm)
- Fatalities: 21 fatalities

Just before Christmas of 2009, an area of low pressure formed in eastern Texas, and began to track on a northwards track. Interacting with cold air from the west, snow broke out on the western side of the system, stretching from Oklahoma to southern Minnesota. The storm grew to an immense size, stretching from the Gulf Coast to the Upper Midwest, spreading a line of thunderstorms in the Deep South as well late on December 24. The blizzard dumped up to 40 inches (100 cm) in a few areas, before spiraling into the Upper Midwest, and dissipating less than 48 hours later around December 26.

The storm's rapid development made it difficult for forecasters to predict. The blizzard was reported to have claimed at least 21 lives, and disrupted air travel during the Christmas travel season. In the Southeastern and Central United States, an outbreak of 28 tornadoes occurred between December 23–24. The storm, a Category 5 "Extreme" one on the Regional Snowfall Index scale, was the first winter weather event to rank as such since the North American blizzard of 1996.

=== New Years nor'easter ===
- Category 2 "Significant" (RSI/NOAA: 3.735)
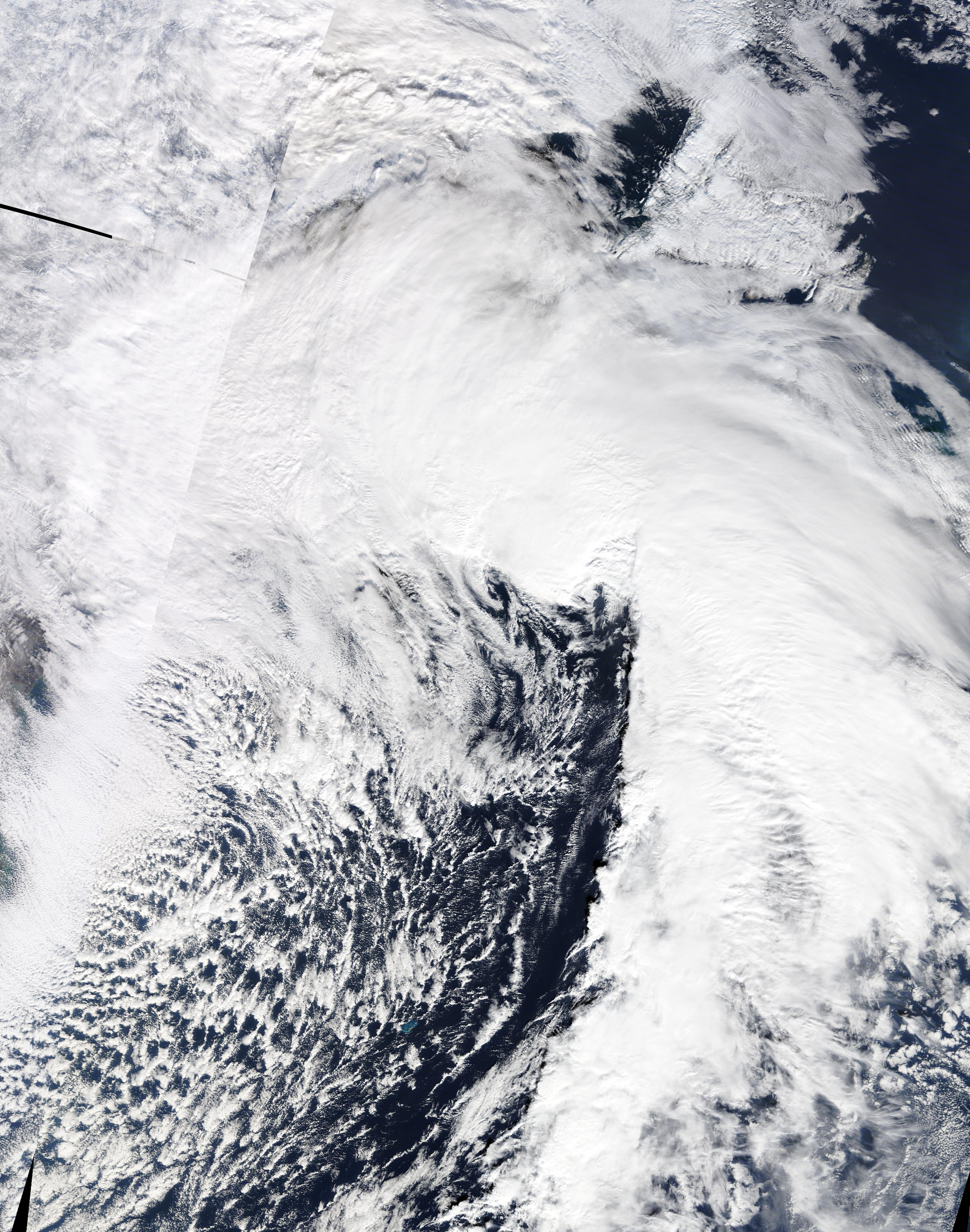
- Duration: December 28, 2009 – January 4, 2010
- Lowest pressure: 980 mb (28.94 inHg)
- Maximum snow: 32.9 in (84 cm)

A medium-sized nor'easter formed in Texas and brought moderate snow to the western portion of the state on December 29. In anticipation of the event Texas Governor Rick Perry activated his resources ahead of the winter storm. It then moved through the Southeast and brought heavy rain and freezing rain to higher altitudes. Some snow was reported in Clayton, Georgia, but did not accumulate. It then moved quickly up the East Coast of the United States, bringing freezing rain and sleet to the Mid-Atlantic and moderate to heavy snow to the Tri-State Area (New York, New Jersey, Connecticut). 5 inches (13 cm) at the most was reported in White Plains 4.5 inches (11 cm) in Hartford. It then brought about 2 inches (5.1 cm) to Boston and southeastern New England. Overnight January 1, it strengthened explosively over water and looped back around to create a blizzard in northern New England. Up to 19 inches (48 cm) was on the ground in Lubec, Maine, by Sunday, and on Saturday it moved to southern New England. 13 inches (33 cm) fell in Lexington, Massachusetts, making that the most fallen in southern New England in the season. Boston received 9 inches (23 cm). The storm moved into the Labrador Sea by Sunday afternoon, leaving behind a pattern where multiple storms within the broader low undergo cyclogenesis to track north of Newfoundland.

=== Early January cold wave ===
Cold temperatures persisted across much of the country within the first half of the month, with near-record breaking temperatures following behind a storm on January 6. Wind chills dropped to as low as −50 °F (−46 °C) in parts of North Dakota in its wake. Temperatures within the High Plains and stretching to parts of the Southeast and East averaged 5 to 10 °C (9 to 18 °F) below average during the first half of January. Many locations in Florida also experienced record cold temperatures which led to agricultural damage occurring as a result. Pensacola, Florida experienced 10 days of temperatures staying below 0 °C (32 °F), and 175 new record lows for the month of January were set statewide.

=== Mid-January Northeast Pacific winter storms ===
A group of seven powerful winter storms affected Canada and the Contiguous United States, particularly California. The storms developed as a result of an atmospheric river that opened from the West Pacific Ocean into the Western Seaboard. The storms shattered multiple records across the Western United States, with the sixth storm breaking records for the lowest recorded air pressure in multiple parts of California, which was also the most powerful winter storm to strike the Southwestern United States in 140 years. The storms dumped record amounts of rain and snow in the Western United States, and also brought hurricane-force winds to the U.S. West Coast, causing flooding and wind damage, as well as triggering blackouts across California that cut the power to more than 1.3 million customers. The storms killed at least 10 people, and caused more than $66.879 million (2010 USD) in damages.

=== Late January Iowa ice storm ===
A damaging ice storm occurred from January 20–22 in the state of Iowa, as another system moved through the region. Embedded thunderstorms were also reported within the ice storm, although the event did not last long, with freezing drizzle and gusty winds persisting afterwards for the next day. Peak accumulations ranged from 0.75–1 inch (19–25 mm) in the hardest hit areas, and as much as 60,000 people were estimated to have lost power as a result from the damage, as a result of nearly 1,000 miles (1,600 km) of power lines being damaged or fallen. At least one person was confirmed to have died. Several counties in Iowa declared a state of disaster due to the damage incurred by the ice storm, estimated to be at least $35 million.

=== Late January winter storm ===
- Category 2 "Significant" (RSI/NOAA: 5.28)
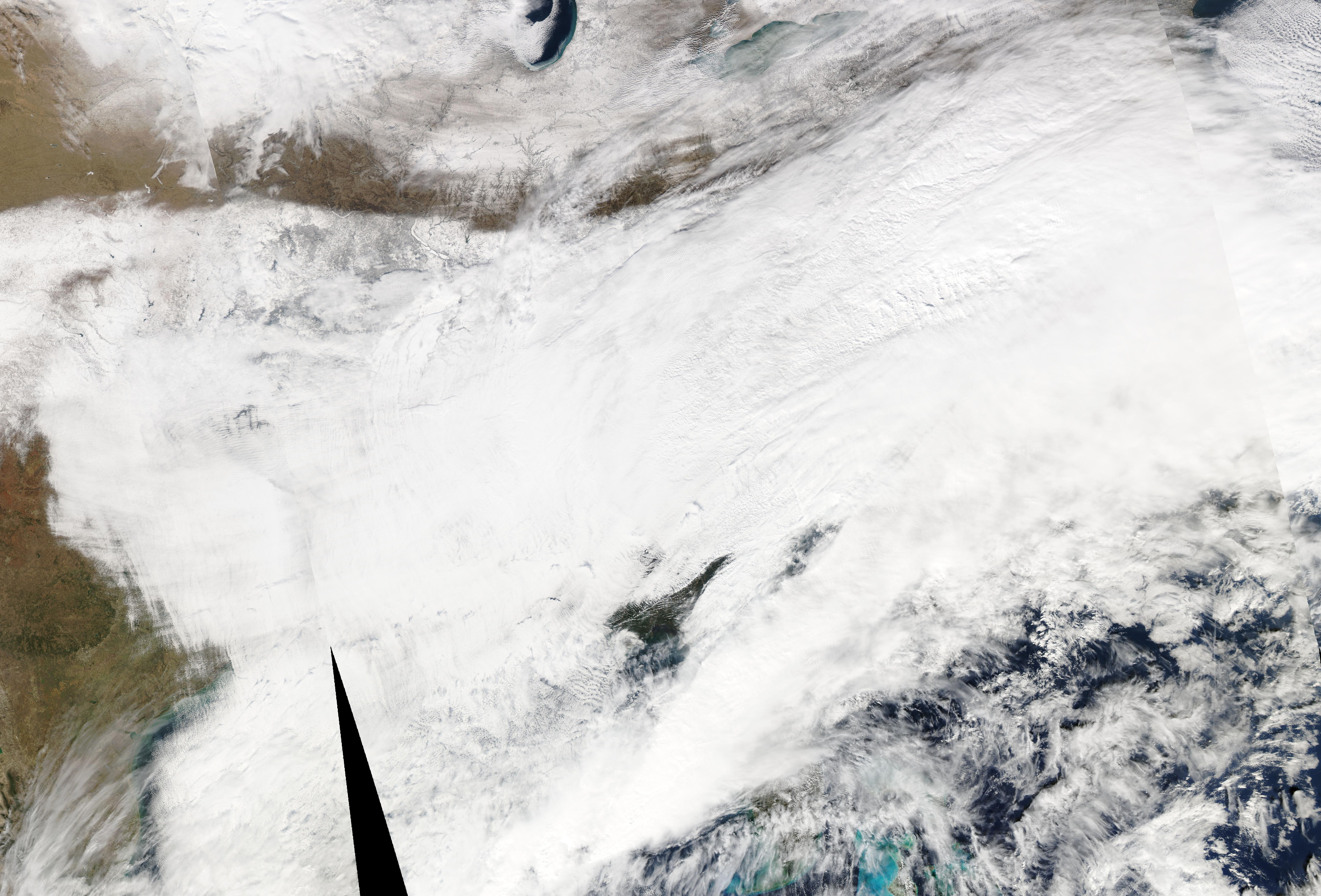
- Duration: January 28 – January 31, 2010
- Lowest pressure: 997 mb (29.44 inHg)
- Maximum snow: 25 in (64 cm)
- Fatalities: 13 fatalities

In late January, a winter storm affected the upper parts of the Southeast, specifically in the Carolinas. Originating from a weak area of low pressure that had formed from a large upper-level low in the Central U.S. late on January 29, it began to track to the east, and due to interacting with cold air that was in place over the Northeast, snow began to form around the North Carolina–South Carolina border, with heavy snowfall beginning to creep northwards. As the system moved towards the East Coast, snowfall rates began to increase to 1–2 inches (2.5–5.1 cm) per hour. The storm began to accelerate, and began to crank out the last burst of snowfall along the affected areas before moving offshore. Total snowfall accumulations ranged from 8–14 inches (20–36 cm), mainly in North Carolina. Snowfall was even reported as far north as southern New Jersey, and a thick band of ice accumulations of up 0.4 inches (10 mm) was also reported further south. 13 people were confirmed to have bene killed as a result of the storm.

=== February cold wave ===
Another outbreak of arctic air occurred in February, persisting for most of the month, which allowed for many winter storms to affect the United States and North America as a whole in short succession. Very cold temperatures were recorded as far south as the Gulf Coast, and the national average temperature in the United States for the month of February ended up slightly below average as a result. Temperatures below 0 °F (−18 °C) were observed in rare locations due to expansive snowpack, with the town of Louisa, Virginia reaching a temperature of −3 °F (−19 °C) on February 7.

=== Early February blizzards ===
Two blizzards occurred in very close proximity in the Northeast during a timespan from February 5–11. This put many areas in the Northeast towards their snowiest winter on record. Both were rated on the Regional Snowfall Index, a Category 3 for the first, and a Category 2 for the latter. While having very similar snow totals in its aftermaths, the origins were very different. In total, the back-to-back snowstorms produced record snowfall amounts in some areas and even pushed areas towards their snowiest season on record. They were also mentioned in the media, with the first blizzard receiving unofficial names like "Snowmageddon", "Snowpocalypse" and such, with the latter receiving an unofficial name of "Snoverkill".

==== First blizzard (February 5–6) ====
- Category 4 "Crippling" (RSI/NOAA: 10.15)
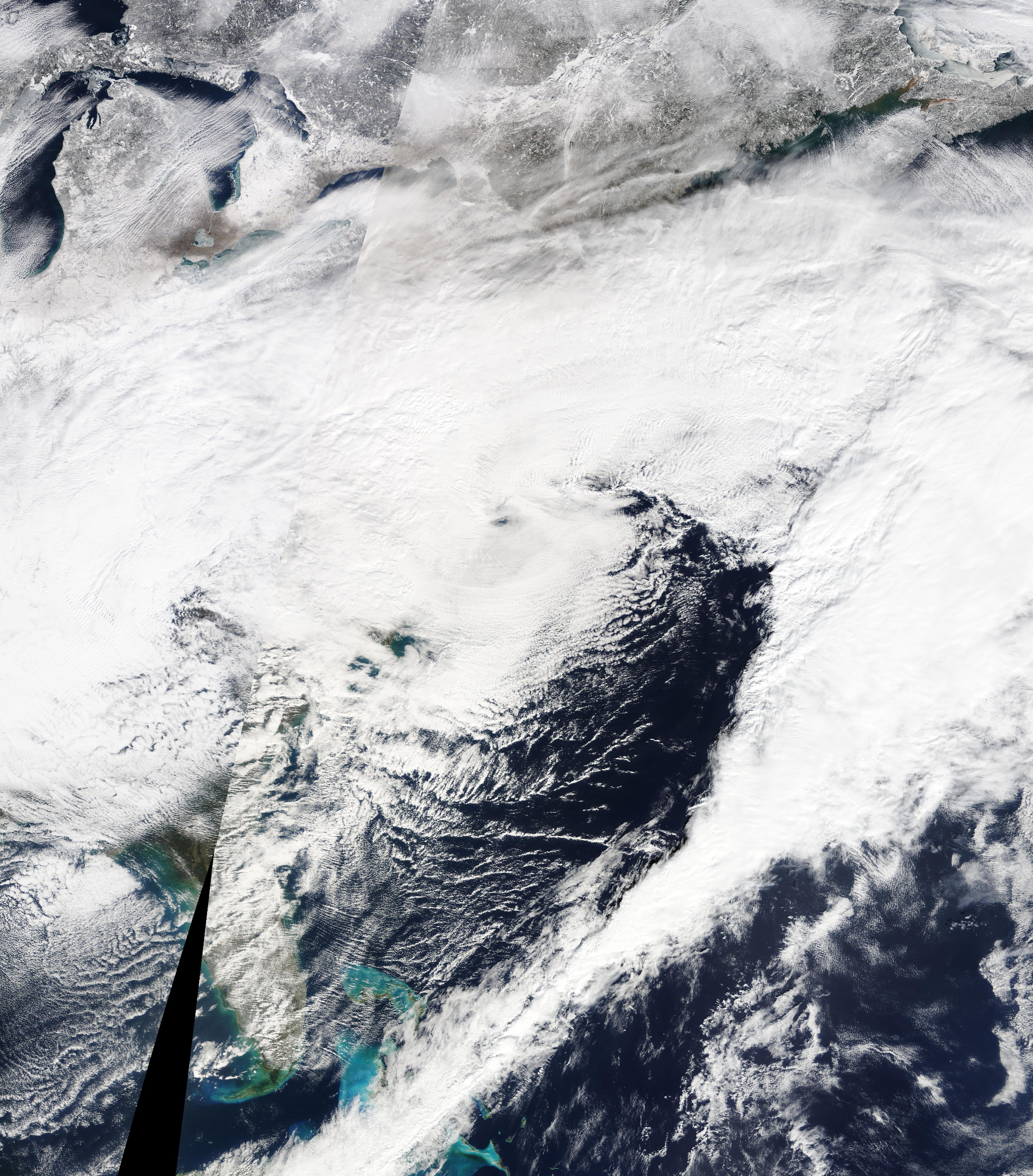
- Duration: February 1 – February 6, 2010
- Lowest pressure: 976 mb (28.82 inHg)
- Maximum snow: 38.3 in (97 cm)
- Fatalities: 41 fatalities
- Damage: $300 million (2010 USD)

This was the first blizzard in February 2010 that had major and widespread impact in the Northeastern United States. The storm's center tracked from Baja California Sur on February 2, to the east coast on February 6, 2010, before heading east out into the Atlantic. Effects were felt to the north and west of this track in northern Mexico, California, and the southwestern, midwestern, southeastern, and most notably mid-Atlantic States. Severe weather, including extensive flooding and landslides in Mexico, and historic snowfall totals in every one of the Mid-Atlantic states, brought deaths to Mexico, New Mexico, Virginia, Pennsylvania, and Maryland.

Most crippling was the widespread 20 to 35 in (50 to 90 cm) of snow accumulated across southern Pennsylvania, the Eastern Panhandle of West Virginia, northern Virginia, Washington, D.C., Maryland, Delaware, and South Jersey, bringing air and interstate highway travel to a halt. Rail service south and west of Washington, D.C., was suspended, and rail travel between D.C. and Boston was available with limited service. Blizzard conditions were reported in a relatively small area of Maryland, but near-blizzard conditions occurred across much of the Mid-Atlantic region. The nor'easter reached a minimum central pressure of 976 mb while out at sea on February 7.

==== Second blizzard (February 9–10) ====
- Category 2 "Significant" (RSI/NOAA: 3.12)
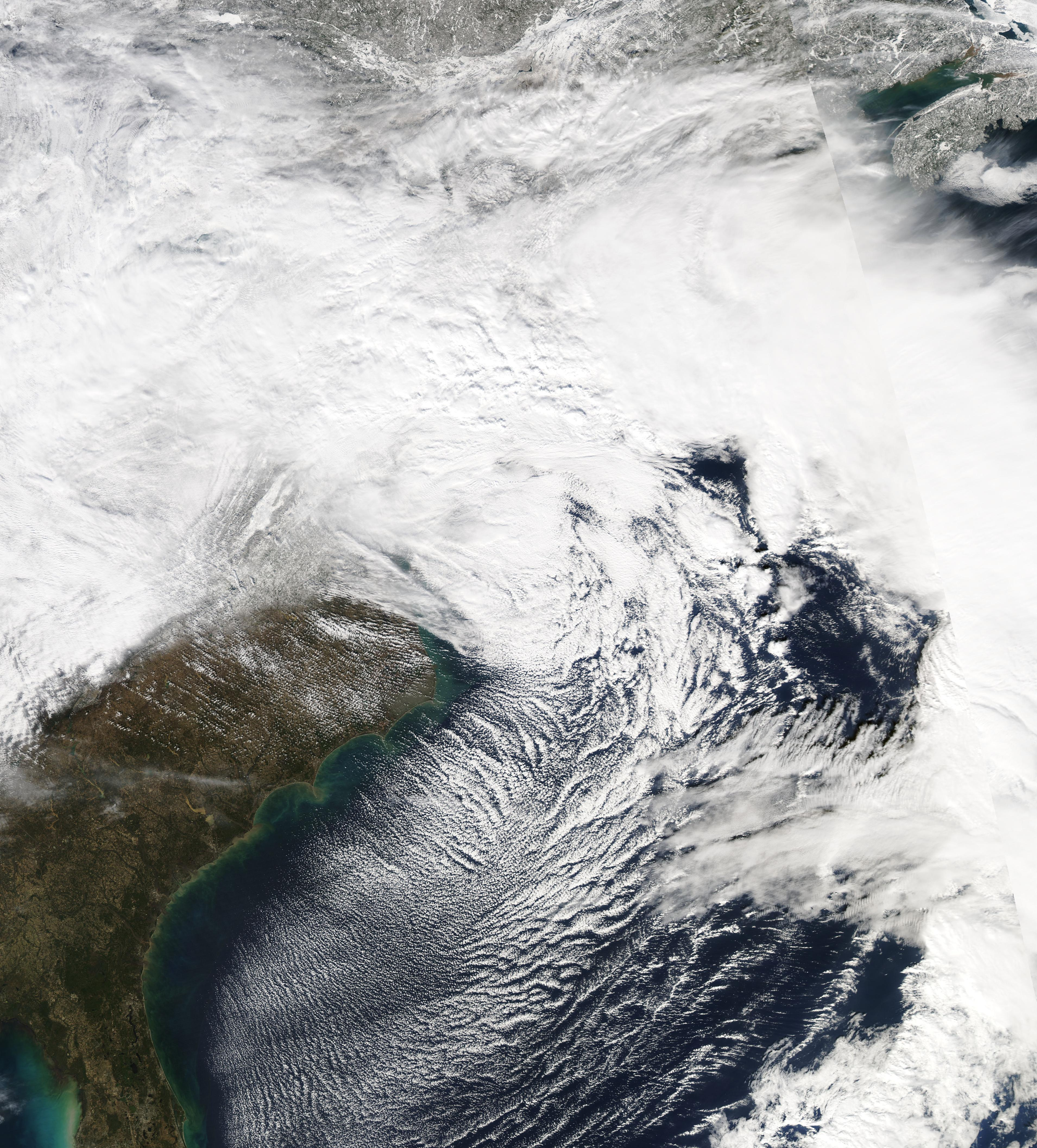
- Duration: February 7 – February 11, 2010
- Lowest pressure: 969 mb (28.61 inHg)
- Maximum snow: 27.5 in (70 cm)
- Fatalities: 3 fatalities

Less than two days after the previous storm had left the East Coast, another significant snowstorm pummeled nearly the same areas, throwing off many people and delaying cleanup efforts from the first storm. This storm began as a classic "Alberta clipper", starting out in Canada and then moving southeast, and finally curving northeast while rapidly intensifying off the New Jersey coast, forming an eye, something that a blizzard in 2005 had done (ironically 10 years later, another severe blizzard did the same). The National Weather Service, in an interview with The Baltimore Sun's weather reporter Frank Roylance, likened this storm to a Category 1 hurricane. Forecasters told Roylance that "Winds topped 58 mph over part of the Chesapeake Bay, and 40 mph gusts were common across the region as the storm's center deepened and drifted slowly along the mid-Atlantic coast". Total snow accumulations from this system were generally about 15–30 miles (24–48 km) further north then the previous blizzard snow totals had been, with accumulations peaking around 28 inches (71 cm) (one area in Maryland in the higher elevations, picked up nearly 62 inches (5.2 ft)).

On February 11, BWI and Dulles airports set new daily snow depth records of 34 in (86 cm) and 26 in (66 cm), respectively. There were few places for city workers to put the plowed snow, since there are restrictions on dumping snow into bodies of water within most jurisdictions. Baltimore used empty parking lots, city parks, and the Pimlico Race Course. It dumped the snow in the Inner Harbor after securing permission to do so from the Maryland Department of the Environment. The National Weather Service issued blizzard warnings from Washington, D.C., to Long Island, including New York City, as well as the entire Philadelphia metro area and the entire states of Maryland, Delaware, and New Jersey. Winter storm warnings for heavy snowfall were posted from Illinois to Massachusetts, and the federal government was closed for the third day in a row (and was closed again the next day, February 11). Many schools were closed, from those in the Washington, D.C., area, through Philadelphia, and into New York City (only the third snow day for New York City Public Schools since 2003).

=== Pre-Valentine's Day southern U.S. winter storm ===
- Category 4 "Crippling" (RSI/NOAA: 12.749)
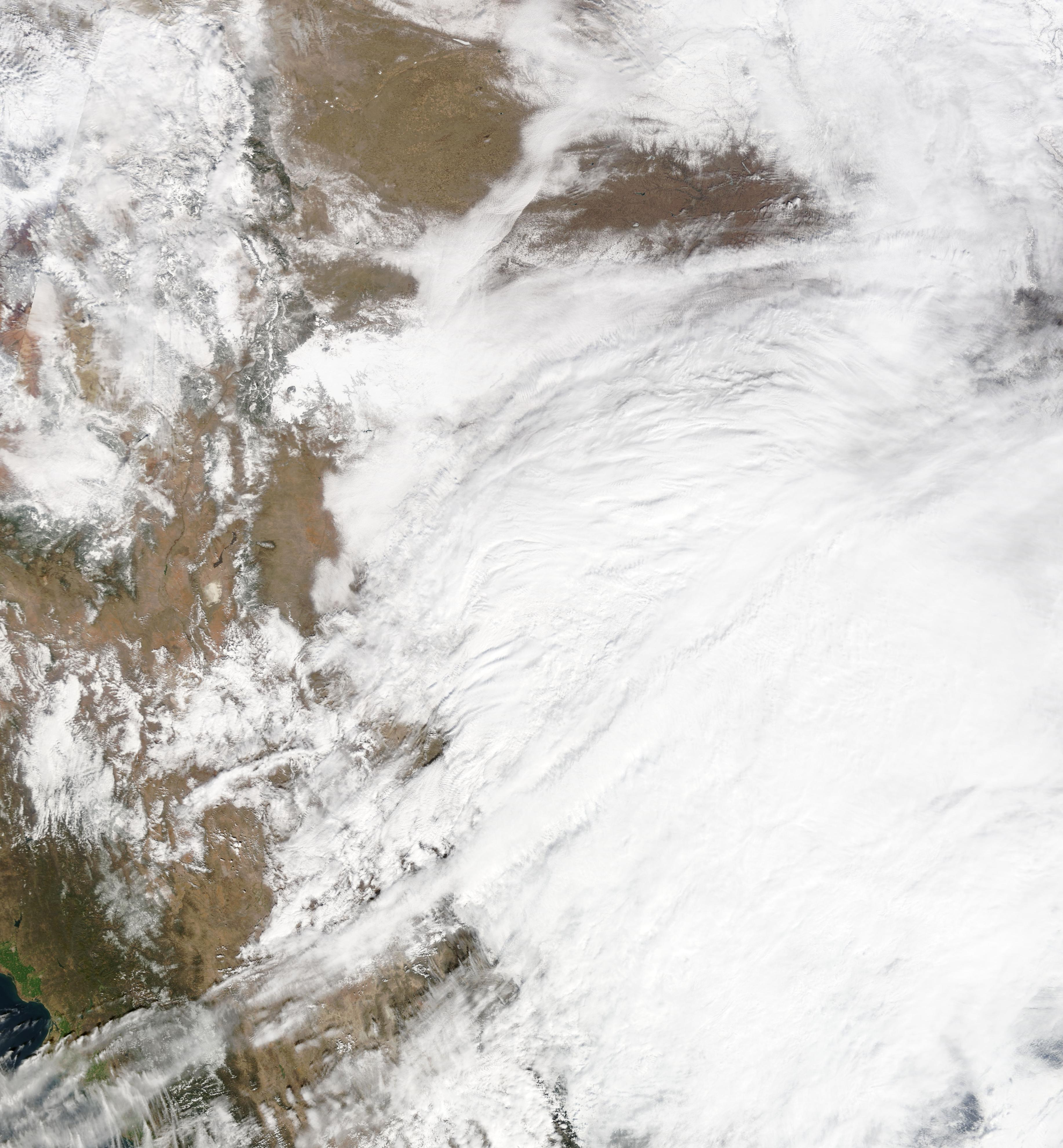
- Duration: February 8 – February 12, 2010
- Lowest pressure: 986 mb (29.12 inHg)
- Maximum snow: 14.9 in (38 cm)

Following a storm in the southeast United States on February 12–13, snow was on the ground simultaneously in all 50 U.S. states, an event believed never to have occurred previously. Snow was confirmed in 49 states by February 13, and small patches of remnant snow on the north face of Mauna Kea in Hawai'i were confirmed soon after. The snow on February 12–13 forced the cancellation of Bi-Lo Myrtle Beach Marathon XIII after the 5k portion had been run the previous night. A record depth of 12.5 inches of snow fell within 24 hours in the Dallas–Fort Worth urban metro on the 13th. The result of the massive snowstorm led to whole school districts being shut down and over 200,000 buildings were left without power, and forced to use fire and candles to light and heat their homes. A 1 ft tall wind-induced wave swept 3 people off of various southern Californian beaches on February 14, slightly injuring one. Light snow fell in both parts of Hampshire and Fife, and heavily in the mountainous regions of Sakhalin Island on the 15th. About 1,800 out of 24,00 flights at Hartsfield Jackson Atlanta Airport were canceled on February 13. Numerous minor car accidents happened all around the Metro Atlanta area.

=== Late February blizzard ===
- Category 4 "Crippling" (RSI/NOAA: 17.82)
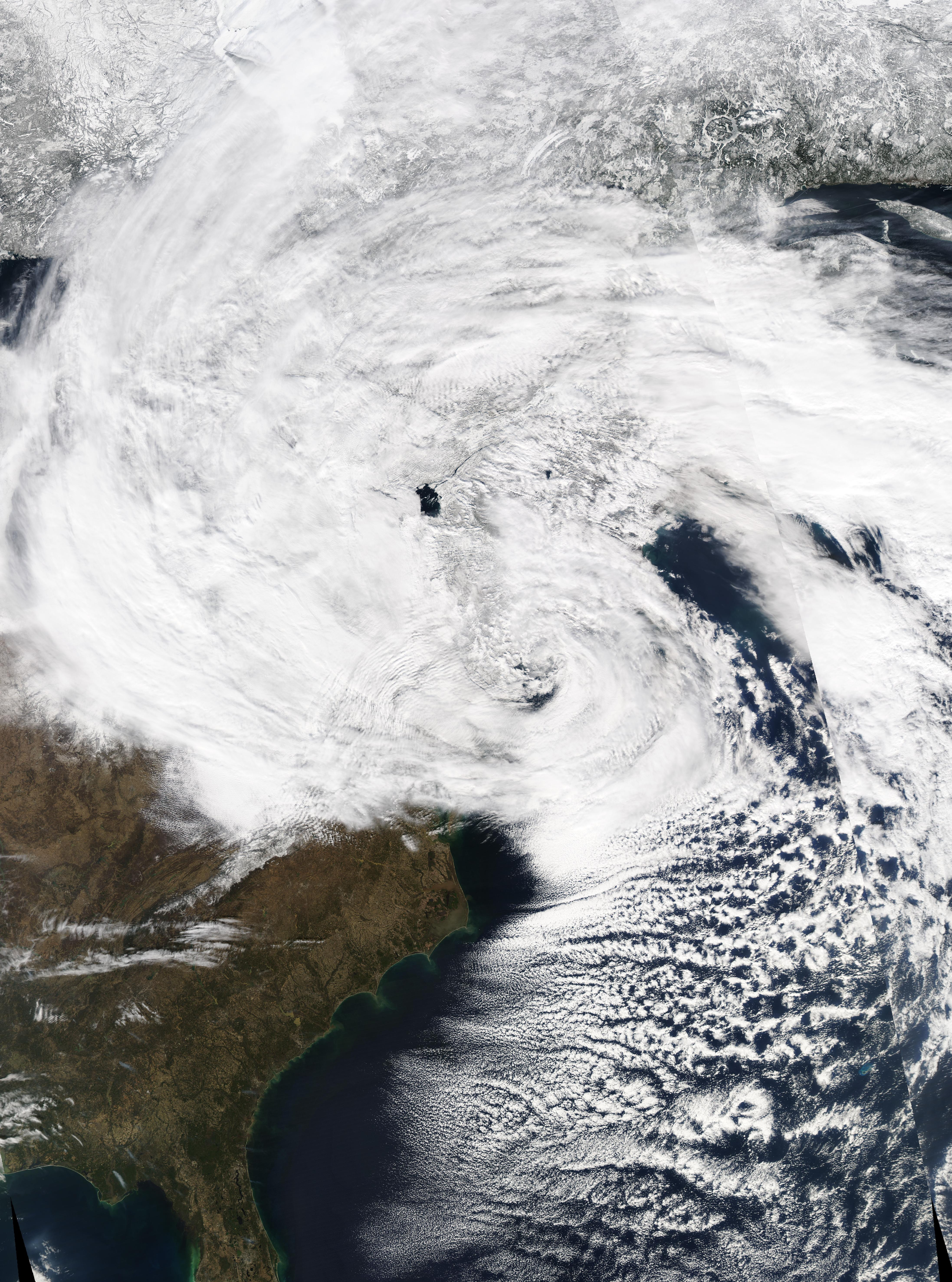
- Duration: February 24 – February 27, 2010
- Lowest pressure: 972 mb (28.70 inHg)
- Maximum snow: 52 in (130 cm)
- Fatalities: 1 fatalities
- Damage: $300 million (2010 USD)

Near the end of the month, another blizzard struck parts of New England, New York, New Jersey, and Pennsylvania. This storm was a complex combination of multiple systems, including an upper air low from the northern Great Plains states, and a surface low from the Gulf Coast states. As the surface low tracked northeast from the coast of North Carolina, the upper air low transferred its energy to it, eventually enabling the new storm to undergo rapid intensification near the shore of eastern Long Island. A strong blocking regime of high pressure over the Canadian Maritime provinces prevented the storm system from exiting to the east. This resulted in a cutoff low (not influenced by the predominant jet stream currents), which took a highly unusual track, retrograding west into New York state before looping back out to sea. Total snowfall accumulations were as high as 36 inches (91 cm) in areas further inland, while New York City picked up 20.9 inches of snow.

Peak official wind gusts of 91 mph (146 km/h) in Portsmouth and 94 mph (151 km/h) at Seabrook Station Nuclear Power Plant were recorded. A gust of 132 mph (212 km/h) was recorded at Mount Washington. More than 230,000 homes and business lost power due to the storm in New Hampshire. Various power utilities reported outages in New Jersey that affected about 14,000 customers. The heaviest snows fell in the northern and western parts of the state, with locations in Sussex County reporting more than 24 inches (61 cm). Bergen, Passaic, Hudson, and Union counties, where many of New York City's western suburbs are located, reported snowfall totals of 12 to 20 inches (30 to 51 cm). The National Weather Service predicted that much of the accumulations would occur in the southeastern portion of the state, with hard hit areas getting as much as 24 inches (61 cm) of snow. The storm left more than 150,000 homes and businesses in the state without power. In the Hudson Valley, almost 150,000 Central Hudson Gas & Electric customers lost power during the storm, the most in the utility's history. The New York State Police reported two fatalities resulting from the weather. Heavy snow forced New York State troopers to close 40 miles (64 km) of Interstate 84 from Newburgh to the Connecticut state line, as well as sections of the Taconic Parkway. New York State transportation officials required vehicles to be equipped with snow chains or 4-wheel drive to travel on passable roadways within the storm's impact area; vehicles lacking chains or 4-wheel drive were stopped or turned back at inspection checkpoints. In New York City, 20.9 inches (53 cm) fell in Central Park, mixed with slushy accumulation due to above-freezing temperatures during the day. Falling tree branches due to the heavy wet snow and strong winds resulted in one casualty (Elmaz Qyra) in Central Park and created dangerous conditions on the streets.

=== Mid-March nor'easter ===
- Category 0 "Nuisance" (RSI/NOAA: N/A)
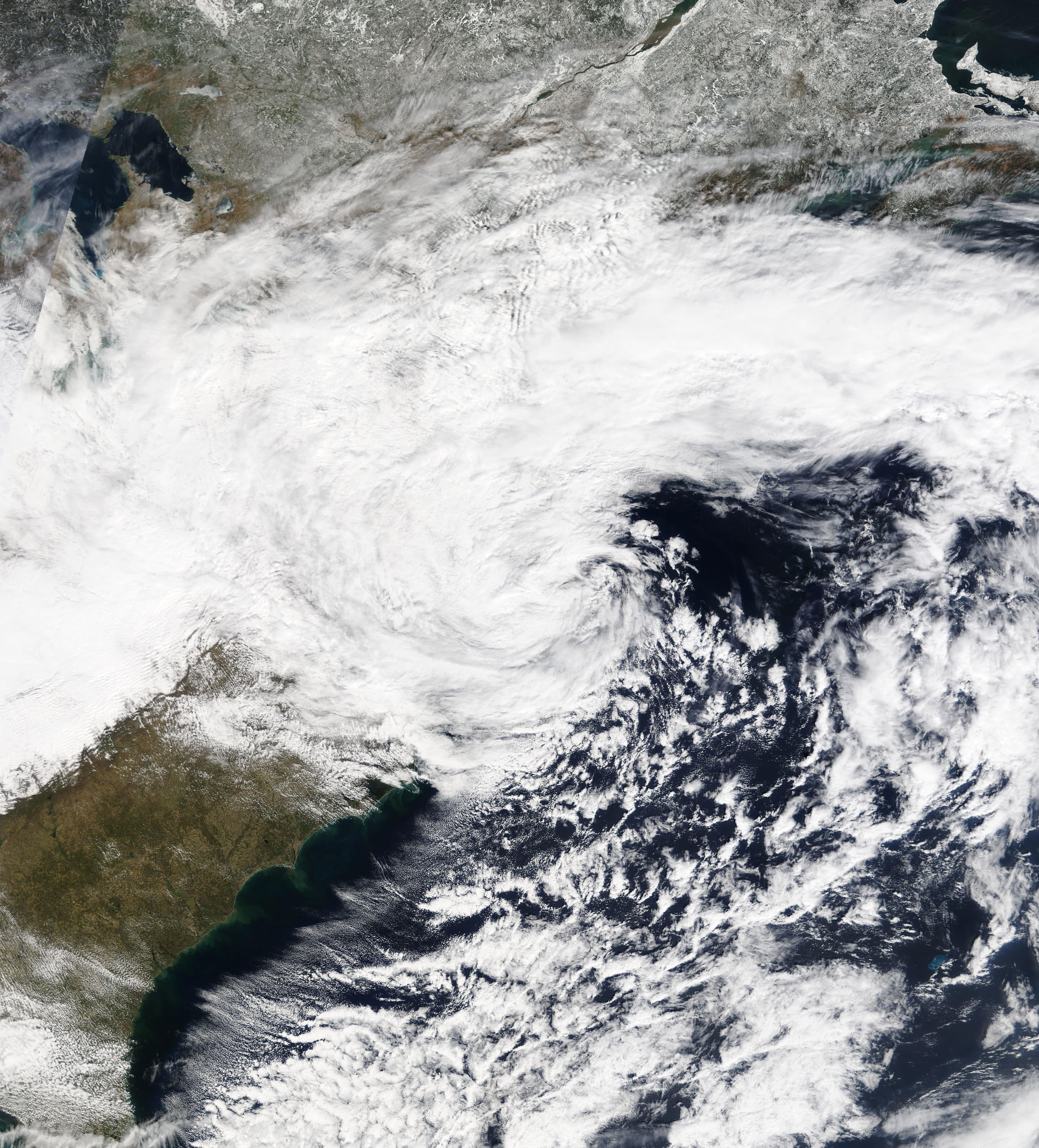
- Duration: March 12 – March 16, 2010
- Lowest pressure: 993 mb (29.32 inHg)
- Fatalities: 7 fatalities
- Damage: $1 billion (2010 USD)

A powerful nor'easter impacted the Northeastern United States and Eastern Canada from March 12–16, resulting in at least nine deaths. The slow-moving storm produced over 10 inches (25 cm) of rain in New England, causing widespread flooding of urban and low-lying areas. Winds of up to 70 miles per hour (110 km/h) snapped trees and power lines, resulting in over one million homes and businesses left without electricity. The storm also caused extensive coastal flooding and beach erosion. Warmer temperatures across the region resulted in precipitation falling as rain, melting a lot of snow. Winds of up to 70 miles per hour (110 km/h) toppled trees and snapped power lines, with the heaviest damage reported in Fairfield County. Falling trees damaged or destroyed several homes in Connecticut, and the destruction was the worst experienced in Fairfield County since Hurricane Gloria struck the state in 1985. At the height of the storm on March 14, more than 110,000 customers were without electricity. By March 16, Connecticut Light and Power (CL&P) reported that 40,000 customers remained in the dark, and public schools remained closed for the entire week. Governor M. Jodi Rell criticized CL&P and promised an investigation after reports surfaced that the company delayed efforts to restore power to reduce employee overtime costs. Three days of rain beginning on Saturday, March 13, 2010, dropped more than 8 inches (20 cm) of rain in Southern Coastal Maine, with multiple road closures. No injuries or deaths were reported, although several roads were washed out, as the region had previously been inundated with flooding from a storm two weeks earlier. Three motorists were rescued from vehicles that became stranded in floodwaters.

=== Late March winter storm ===
- Category 2 "Significant" (RSI/NOAA: 4.69)
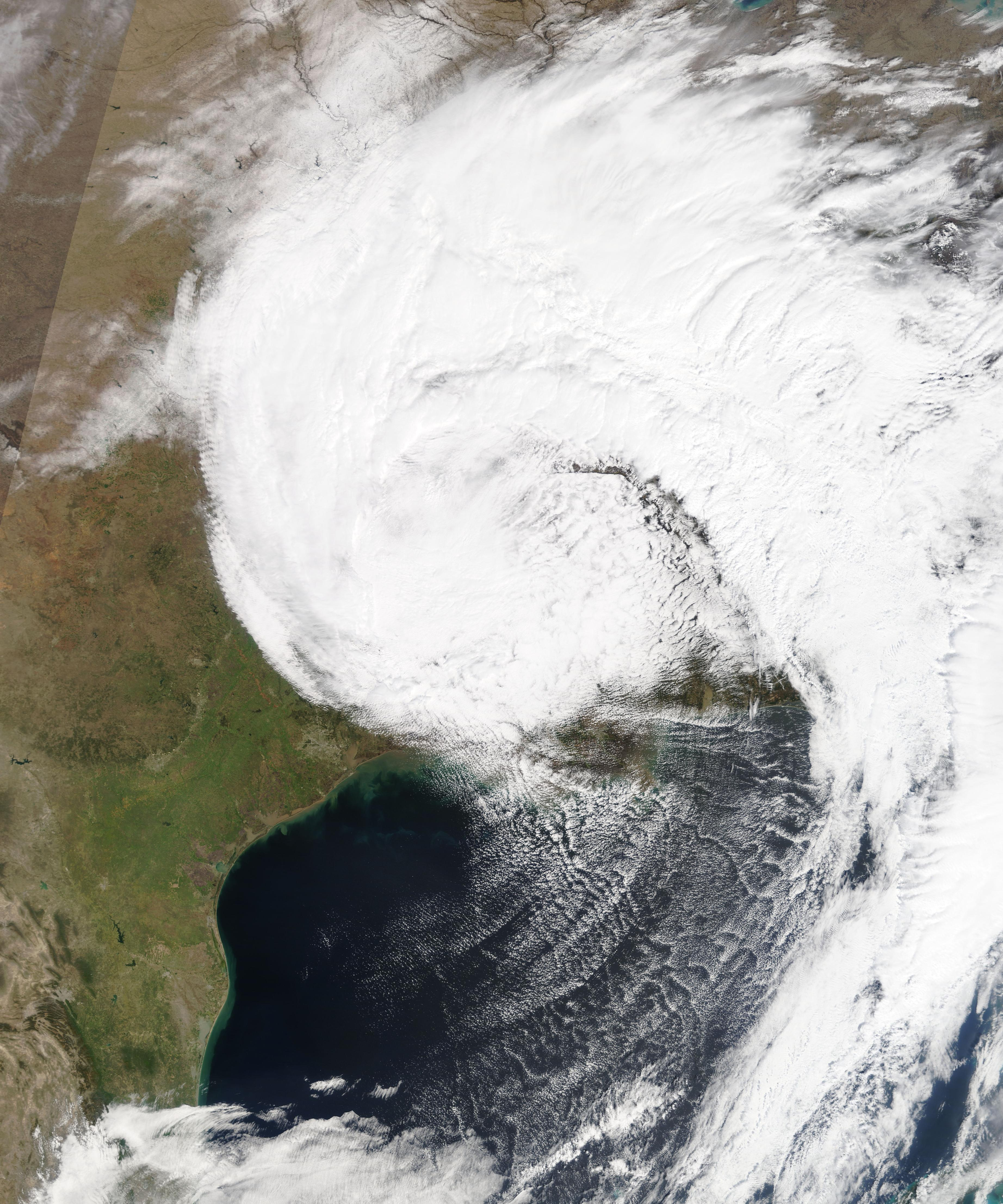
- Duration: March 18 – March 24, 2010
- Lowest pressure: 993 mb (29.32 inHg)
- Maximum snow: 26 in (66 cm)

At the turn of spring, a late-season major winter storm affected much of the Central United States and High Plains, spreading heavy snow from Colorado to Texas and Oklahoma all the way to the Great Lakes. Prior to the storm, on March 19, temperatures were quite mild and in the lower 60 °F (16 °C)s. As heavy snowfall fell in the Rocky Mountains, with as much as 26 inches (66 cm) falling in Boulder, Colorado, a strong cold front moved through Oklahoma and Texas, eventually leading ongoing rain and thunderstorms to change into snow. An upper-level low associated with the winter storm moved through the region, leading to heavy snow falling across Oklahoma and sleet in other areas. Snowfall rates reached as high as 2 inches (5.1 cm) an hour in some locations. Following the storm, after impacting the Midwestern United States, accumulations ranged from 6–10 inches (15–25 cm), such as 5.5 inches (14 cm) in Amarillo, Texas and 11 inches (28 cm) in Westville, Oklahoma. Additional accumulations also were heavy in the states of Missouri and Iowa, with as much as 1 foot (12 in; 30 cm) falling in the former.

=== Late April New England snowstorm ===
A major snowstorm hit New England after the western side of a low pressure system sank southward from eastern Ontario on April 27, merging with part of a second low. Vermont was hit with the most snow, which totaled as much as 60 cm (2.0 ft). Close to 30,000 customers were left without power.

== Records ==
=== United States ===
Following a storm in the southeast United States on February 12–13, snow was on the ground simultaneously in all 50 U.S. states, an event believed never to have occurred previously. Snow was confirmed in 49 states by February 13, and small patches of remnant snow on the north face of Mauna Kea in Hawai'i were confirmed soon after.

== Season effects ==
This is a table of all of the events that have occurred in the 2009–10 North American winter. It includes their duration, damage, impacted locations, and death totals. Deaths in parentheses are additional and indirect (an example of an indirect death would be a traffic accident), but were still related to that storm. All of the damage figures are in 2010 USD.

Regional snowfall index scale
C0	C1	C2	C3	C4	C5

2009–10 North American winter season statistics
Event name	Dates active	RSI category	RSI value	Highest gust mph (km/h)	Minimum pressure (mbar)	Maximum snow in (cm)	Maximum ice in (mm)	Areas affected	Damage (2010 USD)	Deaths
October West Coast cyclone	October 13–15	N/A	N/A	Unknown	966	Unknown	N/A	Southeast Alaska Western Canada Eastern Canada Contiguous United States Northern Mexico	$8.861 million	2
Ex-Hurricane Ida ("Nor'Ida")	November 11–17	N/A	N/A	Unknown	992	Unknown	Unknown	Southern United States Northeastern United States Atlantic Canada	$300 million	6
Early December winter storm	December 7–11	Category 3	8.397	Unknown	974	48 (120)	Unknown	Western United States Midwestern United States Northeastern United States	Unknown	16
Mid-December blizzard	December 18–21	Category 4	12.78	45–50 (72–80)	968	26.3 (67)	Unknown	Southern United States Northeastern United States Atlantic Canada	Unknown	7
Christmas Eve storm complex	December 18–21	Category 5	19.62	Unknown	985	40 (120)	Unknown	Midwestern United States Southern United States Ontario Northeastern United States	Unknown	21
Late December–early January nor'easter	December 28 – January 4	Category 2	3.735	Unknown	980	32.9 (84)	Unknown	Southern United States Northeastern United States Ontario	Unknown	0
Late January winter storm	January 28–31	Category 2	5.28	Unknown	997	25 (64)	Unknown	Southern United States Northeastern United States	Unknown	13
First blizzard (February 5–6)	February 1–6	Category 4	10.15	Unknown	978	38.3 (97)	Unknown	Western United States Midwestern United States Northeastern United States Southern United States Eastern Canada	$300 million	41
Second blizzard (February 9–10)	February 7–11	Category 2	3.12	Unknown	969	27.5 (70)	Unknown	Midwestern United States Southern United States Northeastern United States Eastern Canada	Unknown	3
Pre-Valentine's Day southern U.S. winter storm	February 8–12	Category 4	12.749	Unknown	986	14.9 (38)	Unknown	Southern United States	Unknown	0
Late February blizzard	February 24–27	Category 4	17.82	Unknown	972	52 (130)	Unknown	Southern United States Northeastern United States Eastern Canada	$300 million	1
Mid-March nor'easter	March 12–16	N/A	N/A	Unknown	993	Unknown	Unknown	Southern United States Northeastern United States Eastern Canada	$1 billion	9
Season aggregates
17 RSI storms	October 3 – April 30				968	90 (230)	0.3 (7.7)		≥ $3.086 billion	108

== See also ==
- Weather of 2010
- 2010 Northern Hemisphere heat waves

== Notes ==
Preceded by 2008–2009	North American winters 2009–10	Succeeded by 2010–11
