= March 2010 nor'easter =

Blizzard in North America

March 2010 Nor'easter
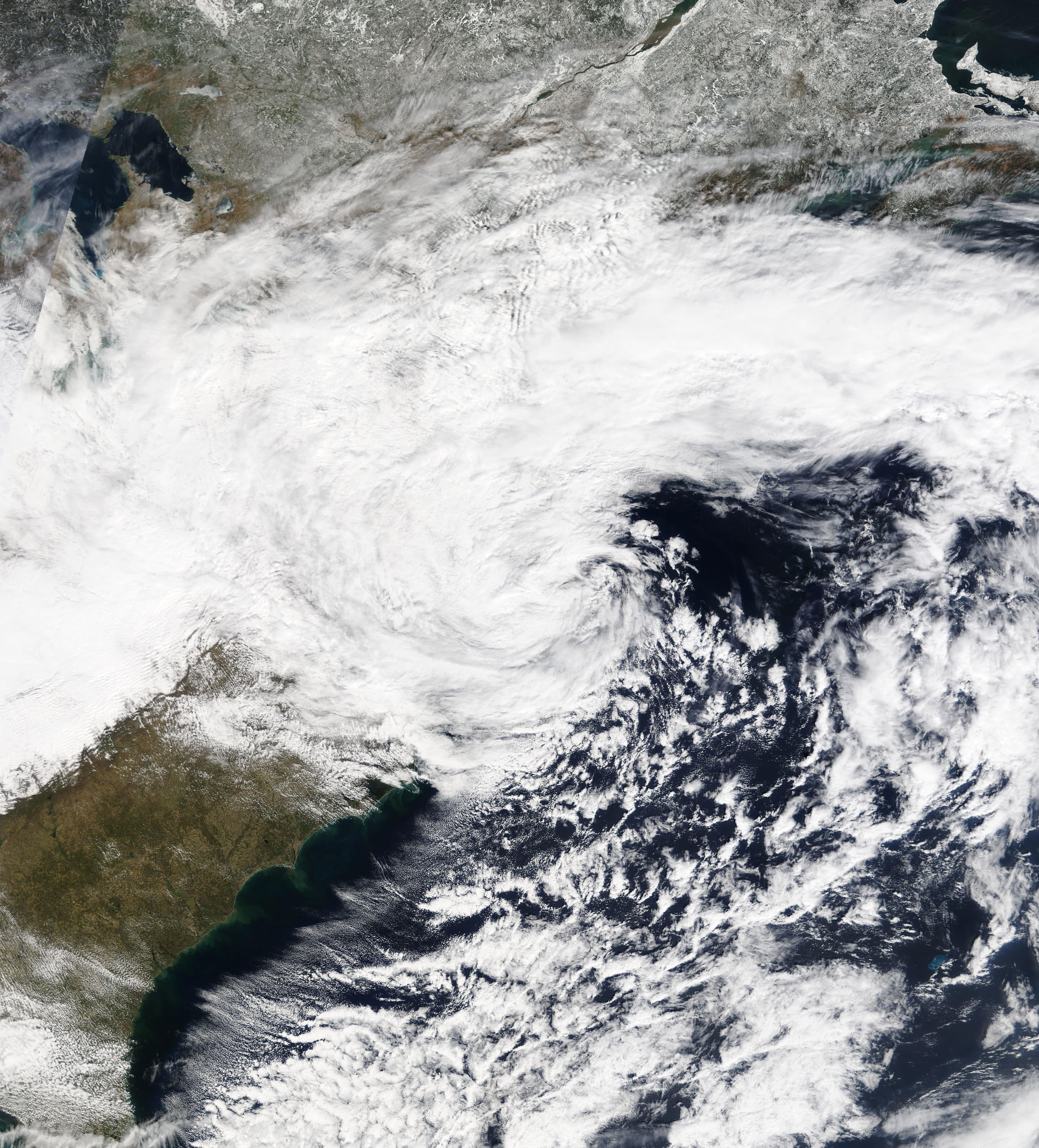
- MODIS imagery of the nor'easter off the Mid-Atlantic coastline on March 15

Meteorological history
- Formed: March 12, 2010
- Exited land: March 16, 2010

Nor'easter
- Highest gusts: 75 mph (121 km/h) at JFK Airport, New York
- Lowest pressure: 993 hPa (mbar); 29.32 inHg
- Maximum rainfall: 10.35 in (26.3 cm) in Winchester, Massachusetts

Overall effects
- Fatalities: 9
- Areas affected: Mid-Atlantic region, New England, Eastern Canada
- Part of the 2009–10 North American winter

The March 2010 nor'easter or St. Patrick's Day nor'easter was a powerful nor'easter that impacted the Northeastern United States and Eastern Canada from March 12–16, 2010, resulting in at least nine deaths. The slow-moving storm produced over 10 inches (25 cm) of rain in New England, causing widespread flooding of urban and low-lying areas. Winds of up to 70 miles per hour (110 km/h) snapped trees and power lines, resulting in over one million homes and businesses left without electricity. The storm also caused extensive coastal flooding and beach erosion. The nor'easter was the fifth major winter storm to impact the Mid-Atlantic and New England in the 2009–10 North American winter storm season.

== Synoptic conditions ==
The winter storm that would impact the Northeastern United States evolved when an area of low pressure moved northeastward from Texas to the Great Lakes region on March 10 and 11. A secondary low pressure center developed near Cape Hatteras, North Carolina and drifted northward to a position south of Cape Cod, Massachusetts by March 14. The system contained abundant moisture feeds from the tropical Pacific Ocean and Gulf of Mexico. Unlike the previous three winter storms that affected the region in February, there was a lack of cold air with this system and precipitation with this storm fell primarily as rain.

Light to moderate rain spread north across the entire region through the day on Friday as the low pressure drifted north and slowly strengthened. With a strong fetch off the Atlantic Ocean, rainfall rates became heavy overnight Friday and through the evening of Saturday March 13th, resulting in small stream and eventually major river flooding. Meanwhile, a high pressure system anchored in the Canadian Maritimes also strengthened and a very strong pressure gradient developed between these pressure systems overnight Friday. This resulted in strong, damaging easterly winds across much of the area through the day Saturday, especially along the New Jersey coast where minor to moderate coastal flooding also occurred. The strong winds and widespread heavy rains slackened off overnight Saturday as the surface low was stationary across the Delmarva region. Showers and even a few thunderstorms continued to rotate in off of the Atlantic through the day on Sunday March 14th and continued into Monday March 15th as the low slowly moved eastward and finally out to sea by Tuesday morning March 16th.

== Impacts ==
=== Connecticut ===
Winds of up to 70 miles per hour (110 km/h) toppled trees and snapped power lines, with the heaviest damage reported in Fairfield County. Falling trees damaged or destroyed several homes in Connecticut, and the destruction was the worst experienced in Fairfield County since Hurricane Gloria struck the state in 1985. At the height of the storm on March 14, more than 110,000 customers were without electricity. By March 16, Connecticut Light and Power (CL&P) reported that 40,000 customers remained in the dark, and public schools remained closed for the entire week. Governor M. Jodi Rell criticized CL&P and promised an investigation after reports surfaced that the company delayed efforts to restore power to reduce employee overtime costs.

=== Maine ===
Three days of rain beginning on Saturday, 13 March 2010 dropped more than 8 inches (20 cm) of rain in Southern Coastal Maine, with multiple road closures. No injuries or deaths were reported, although several roads were washed out, as the region had previously been inundated with flooding from a storm two weeks earlier. Three motorists were rescued from vehicles that became stranded in floodwaters.

=== Massachusetts ===
Up to 10 inches (25 cm) of rain combined with rapidly melting snow from earlier storms caused widespread urban flooding and forced rivers out of their banks across the state. Governor Deval Patrick declared a state of emergency and activated the National Guard to assist in the storm's aftermath. Flooding also shut down sections of commuter rail lines heading into and out of Boston, and caused sewage to overflow from treatment plants and into Boston Harbor.

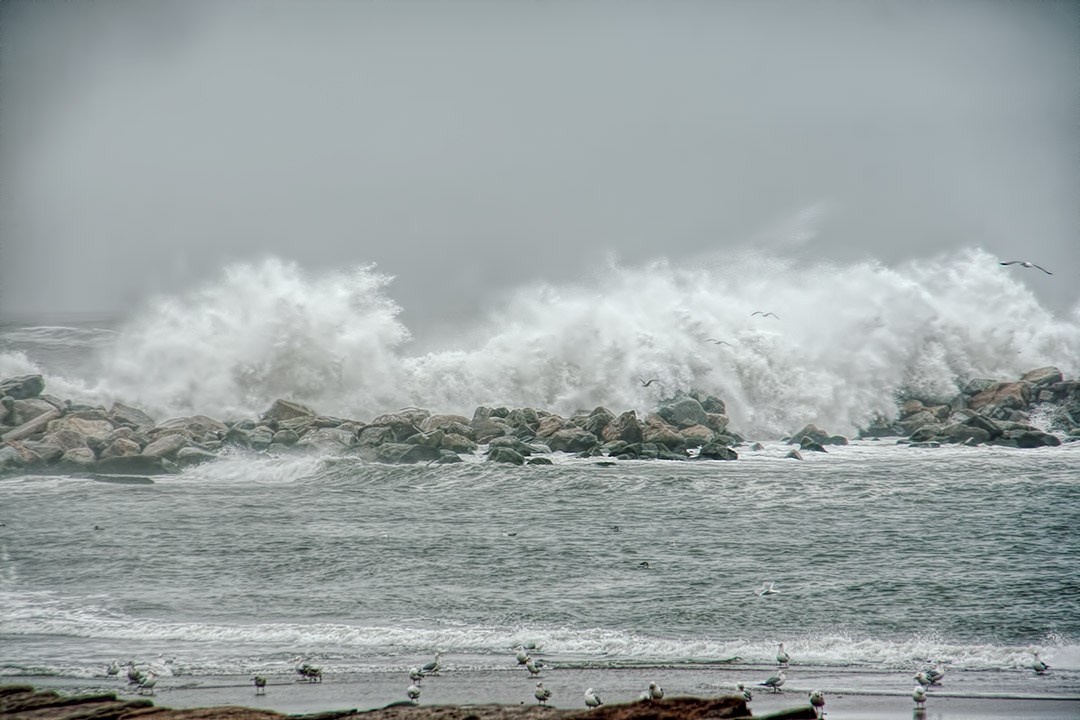
Waves crashing over a rock jetty at Camp Cronin, Point Judith, RI, USA during the March 2010 Nor'easter in the Atlantic Ocean.

=== New Hampshire ===
Most of the significant impacts of this storm was felt in the southern part of the state. While the northern part of New Hampshire saw little to no rain, a widespread 2" of rain fell over the southeastern part of New Hampshire. An isolated part of southern New Hampshire saw as high as 4 to 6 inches of rainfall.

=== New Jersey ===
New Jersey was particularly hard hit with flooding and wind damage and a state of emergency was declared as a result. The strong winds which frequently gusted 50-60 mph in most areas and up to 70 mph in spots wreaked the most havoc statewide, toppling numerous trees onto roads, cars, houses, and power lines causing widespread power outages. In Middlesex County, a large tree fell on a vehicle injuring two people. Wind and rain forced the closure of parts of the New Jersey Turnpike, a near complete shutdown of the NJ Transit system, and toppled a high rise crane in Atlantic City, NJ causing dangerous debris to drop to the ground. PSE&G reported about 459,000 customers lost power during the height of the storm on Saturday March 13th, making it the worst storm in the utility's history.

On Friday morning March 19th, nearly a week after the storm, 2,200 people in the state were still without power and many folks along the Passaic river in northeastern New Jersey were still dealing with major flooding. Thousands of businesses and residents in flood prone areas across the state received damage where major flooding occurred. Officials say more than 1,300 buildings in Morris County alone were damaged because of flooding along the Passaic, Ramapo and Pompton rivers. Preliminary estimates from flooding and wind damage in New Jersey alone are in the millions of dollars. Elsewhere in the area, flooding and wind damage was not as severe, but impacts from minor river flooding and downed trees and power lines were still felt in many areas.

=== New York ===
The New York Metro area experienced intense conditions during the height of the storm which dropped on average 3–6 inches (7.6–15.2 cm) of rain along with wind gusts over 75 miles per hour (121 km/h). The hardest hit location in the metro area was Brooklyn, NY which experienced over 6 inches (150 mm) of rain and wind gusts up to 85 miles per hour (137 km/h). Long Island got hammered with hurricane-force wind gusts of 75–85 miles per hour (121–137 km/h) and heavy bands of rain. Many power outages were reported.

=== Pennsylvania ===
In the Southeastern Pennsylvania area, PECO Energy Company announced that over 135,000 customers lost power in and around the Philadelphia area, with Bucks County taking the most damage. By March 16th, all customers had their power restored.

=== Rhode Island ===
The state of Rhode Island received very heavy rain from the storm, and the Pawtuxet River flooded many towns in the state. Winds exceeded 50 mph at times and roadways were closed in Rhode Island and Connecticut.

== See also ==
- December 2009 North American blizzard
- February 5–6, 2010 North American blizzard
- February 9–10, 2010 North American blizzard
- February 25–27, 2010 North American blizzard
