= February 25–27, 2010 North American blizzard =

Winter Storm

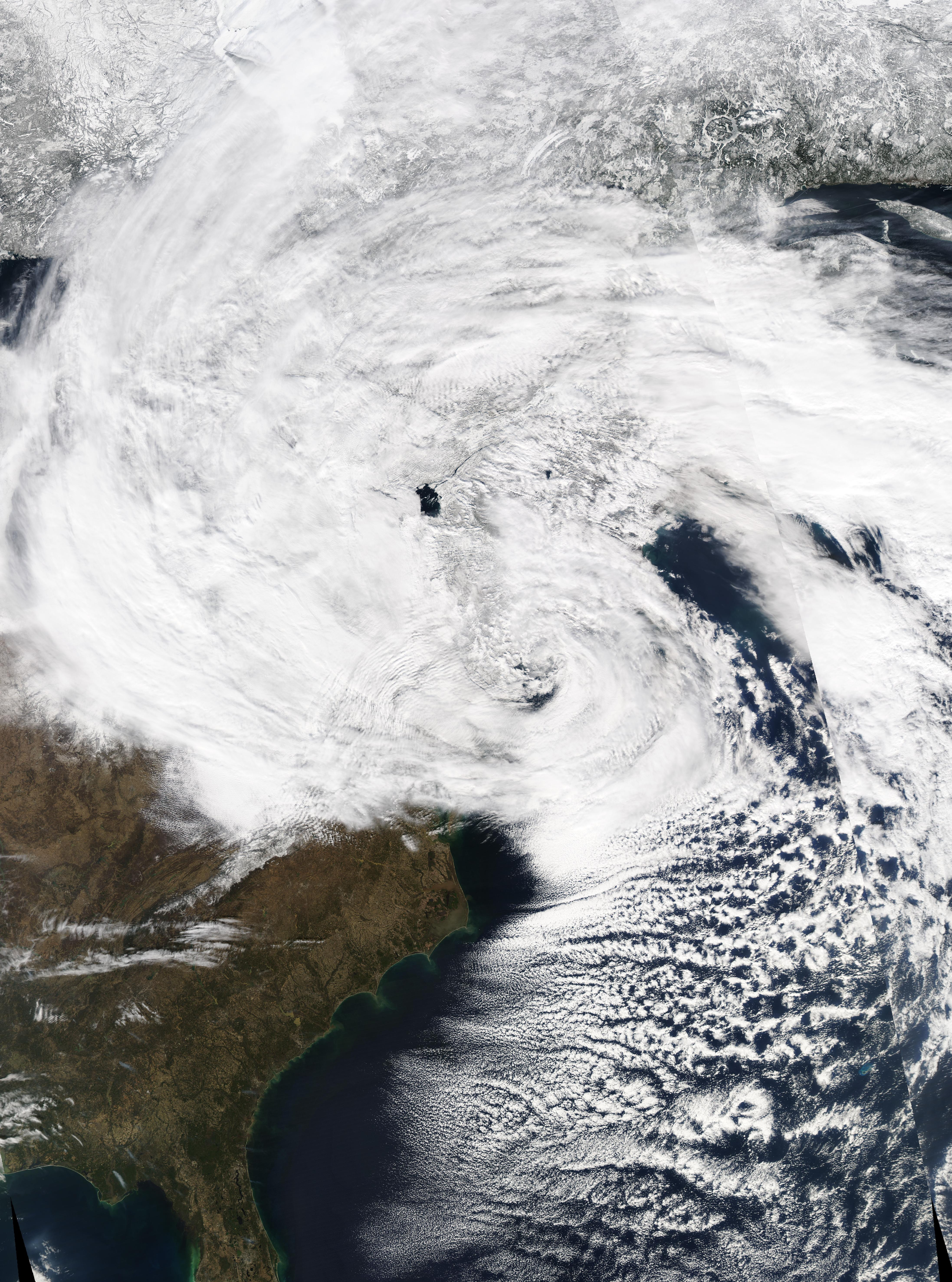
- MODIS imagery of the extratropical cyclone responsible for the blizzard on February 26 from the Aqua satellite

Meteorological history
- Formed: February 24, 2010
- Dissipated: February 27, 2010 (exited to sea)

Category 4 "Crippling" blizzard
- Regional snowfall index: 17.82 (NOAA)
- Lowest pressure: 972 mbar (hPa); 28.70 inHg
- Max. snowfall: 53.0 inches (135 cm) – Potter Hollow, New York

Overall effects
- Fatalities: 1
- Areas affected: Mid-Atlantic region, New England states, West Virginia, Eastern Canada
- Part of the 2009–10 North American winter

The February 25–27, 2010 North American blizzard (also known as the "Snowicane") was a winter storm and severe weather event that occurred in the Mid-Atlantic and New England regions of the United States between February 24 and 26, 2010. The storm dropped its heaviest snow of 12 to 24 inches (30 to 61 cm) (locally as much as 36 inches (91 cm)) across a wide area of interior New England, New York, and Pennsylvania. The storm also brought flooding rains to coastal sections of New England, with some areas experiencing as much as 4 inches (10 cm). Aside from precipitation, the nor'easter brought hurricane-force sustained winds to coastal New England.

This storm was a complex combination of multiple systems, including an upper air low from the northern Great Plains states, and a surface low from the Gulf Coast states. As the surface low tracked northeast from the coast of North Carolina, the upper air low transferred its energy to it, eventually enabling the new storm to undergo rapid intensification near the shore of eastern Long Island. A strong blocking regime of high pressure over the Canadian Maritime provinces prevented the storm system from exiting to the east. This resulted in a cutoff low (not influenced by the predominant jet stream currents), which took a highly unusual track, retrograding west into New York state before looping back out to sea.

== Impact ==
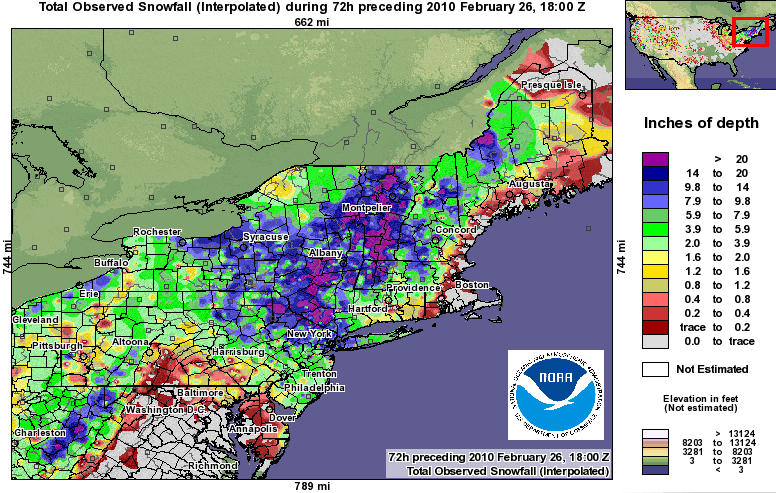
February 25–27, 2010 North American blizzard Mid-Atlantic and New England states snowfall accumulation. Created by the National Weather Service

=== Connecticut ===
Many parts of Connecticut received heavy rainfall from this storm as well as high winds. Rainfall totals above 2 inches (5.1 cm) were widespread over the state. Colder air worked into the state overnight on February 25, changing the rain to snow statewide by the morning of February 26. Schools were closed and train service was reduced on the Metro-North New Haven Line. Snowfall amounts varied from less than an inch in eastern parts of the state to as much as 19 inches (48 cm) in western portions of Fairfield and Litchfield counties.

=== Delaware ===
Northern Delaware received 3 to 4 inches (76 to 102 mm), and lesser amounts were recorded in Kent and Sussex counties.

=== Maine ===
High winds combined with heavy snow were helping bring down power lines early Friday, leaving nearly 100,000 residents out of power in Maine. An unofficial gust of 94 mph (151 km/h) was recorded in Cape Elizabeth.

=== Maryland ===
Snowfall in Maryland from the storm was mostly limited to Garrett County and western Allegany County, where blizzard conditions and deep drifting snow made travel very difficult or impossible on Interstate 68 and U.S. Route 40 in the mountainous western panhandle of the state on February 26. However, strong winds led to scattered power outages in and around Baltimore. As many as 12,500 customers were without power early on Friday, February 26. A peak wind gust of 53 mph (85 km/h) was reported at Baltimore/Washington International Thurgood Marshall Airport, and sustained winds of 30 to 45 mph (48 to 72 km/h) were widespread in the area, which led to the National Weather Service issuing a High Wind Warning for the area.

=== Massachusetts ===
Unofficial wind measurements at Plum Island exceeded 90 mph. Sustained winds in excess of tropical storm force (39 mph (63 km/h)) and heavy rain caused large tree branches in the region to break. This led to power outages, and delays on area transport networks. A spokesman for the Massachusetts Emergency Management Agency reported 85,000 customers in Essex and Middlesex counties were without power the morning of February 26.

MBTA Green Line service on the Riverside Branch was suspended due to fallen branches on the evening of February 25 until the morning of the 26th. A commuter rail locomotive leaving Rowley on the Newburyport/Rockport Line was struck by a large falling tree, resulting in a shutdown of service late in the evening on February 25, with service delays reported the following day.

Flooding was also an issue in the area. About a dozen homes and businesses in Freetown were vacated voluntarily amidst concern that Forge Pond Dam on the Assonet River might burst due to high levels of water from heavy rain.

=== New Hampshire ===
Peak official wind gusts of 91 mph (146 km/h) in Portsmouth and 94 mph (151 km/h) at Seabrook Station Nuclear Power Plant were recorded. A gust of 132 mph (212 km/h) was recorded at Mount Washington. More than 230,000 homes and business lost power due to the storm in New Hampshire. High winds from this storm fueled a five-alarm fire that destroyed five homes in Hampton Beach. The winds hindered firefighters' efforts to bring the fire under control. No casualties were reported.

=== New Jersey ===
Various power utilities reported outages in the state that affected about 14,000 customers. The heaviest snows fell in the northern and western parts of the state, with locations in Sussex County reporting more than 24 inches (61 cm). Bergen, Passaic, Hudson, and Union counties, where many of New York City's western suburbs are located, reported snowfall totals of 12 to 20 inches (30 to 51 cm). Middlesex, Mercer, and Monmouth counties reported as much as 12–18 inches (30–46 cm) of snow during the blizzard. Blowing snow caused by strong winds created snow drifts; blockades for some drivers. Blizzard Warnings and Winter Storm Warnings were posted throughout the state of New Jersey. Ice and snow mixed to cause major roads to transform into hazards for all drivers. Most counties in the southern part got 2 to 6 inches (5.1 to 15.2 cm) during the storm but snow from the past storms didn't make it any better. Delays in Camden and Newark Airports were possibly 2 hours or more. Visibility was reduced to below 1 mile (1.6 km) in most areas. Also, houses took major damage.

=== New York ===
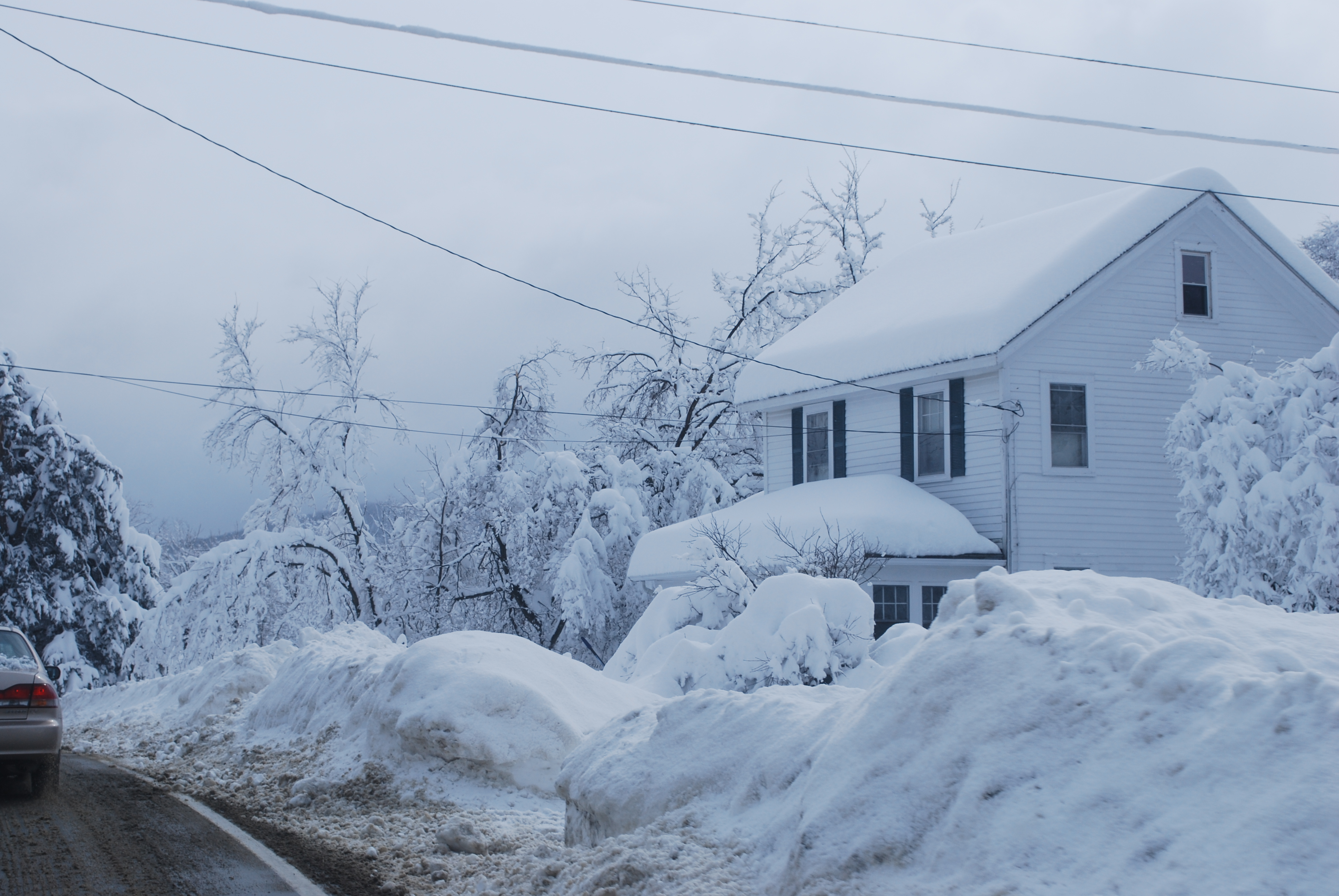
Snowfall in Dutchess County, New York on February 26.

The system began making landfall in the New York region as early as late Wednesday and was the most active area of the storm. The National Weather Service predicted that much of the accumulations would occur in the southeastern portion of the state, with hard hit areas getting as much as 24 inches (61 cm) of snow. The storm left more than 150,000 homes and businesses in the state without power. In the Hudson Valley, almost 150,000 Central Hudson Gas & Electric customers lost power during the storm, the most in the utility's history.

The New York State Police reported two fatalities resulting from the weather. Heavy snow forced New York State troopers to close 40 miles (64 km) of Interstate 84 from Newburgh to the Connecticut state line, as well as sections of the Taconic Parkway. New York State transportation officials required vehicles to be equipped with snow chains or 4-wheel drive to travel on passable roadways within the storm's impact area; vehicles lacking chains or 4-wheel drive were stopped or turned back at inspection checkpoints.

In New York City, 20.9 inches (53 cm) fell in Central Park, mixed with slushy accumulation due to above-freezing temperatures during the day. Falling tree branches due to the heavy wet snow and strong winds resulted in one casualty (Elmaz Qyra) in Central Park and created dangerous conditions on the streets. The New York City Sanitation Department deployed 1600 snow plow and 365 salt spraying trucks to keep traffic flowing smoothly on the highways and city streets of the five boroughs. New York City experienced its 5th largest snowstorm on record, 4th at the time. This, combined with a winter storm earlier in the month resulted in February 2010 becoming the snowiest month on record in New York City.

Several private schools and institutions cancelled classes on Friday, February 26, due to the storm. City mayor Michael Bloomberg originally decided to keep the public schools running on Friday, but acquiesced later when the weather condition worsened overnight.

New York City area's three major airports canceled more than 1,000 flights. About 3,000 usually leave the airports daily. New Jersey Transit canceled buses into New York City. Rail service in New Jersey and Long Island was suspended or delayed.

On February 27, ice from an upper floor of the Sony Building crashed through the building's atrium glass ceiling, injuring at least 15 people attending a Purim party.

=== Pennsylvania ===
On February 24, 2010, PennDOT officials initially requested through local media that drivers stay off the roads during the storm that was expected to hit Pennsylvania on 25–26 February. Officials said interstates and other high-traffic highways would be treated first. Secondary state routes were noted as a lower priority during the severe storms that impacted the state in 2009–10. PennDOT officials noted that they had more than 480,000 tons of salt in stock, and that so far, $159 million of the $180 million winter budget had already been spent. If that budget were exhausted, PennDOT would tap funds normally reserved for spring maintenance.

In the early morning of February 25, several communities in Berks, Lancaster and Lebanon counties issued snow emergencies. The lower Susquehanna Valley in South Central Pennsylvania was expecting to see between 2 and 6 inches (5.1 and 15.2 cm) with isolated amounts around 8 inches (20 cm). Sustained winds at 20 to 30 mph (32 to 48 km/h) and as high as 50 mph (80 km/h) were expected into the early evening.

At 1:00 p.m. EST on February 25, the Pennsylvania Turnpike Commission implemented a 45 mph (72 km/h) speed limit for the entire length of the Northeast Extension of the Pennsylvania Turnpike, a distance of 111 miles (179 km).

At 6:00 p.m. EST on February 25, the Turnpike Commission banned tractor-trailers, other trailers and box trucks which are Class 5, which is 30,001 to 45,000 pounds (13,608 to 20,412 kg), as well as all trucks heavier than Class 5, using the Turnpike's weight classification system for toll calculations, from the Northeast Extension.

On both February 25 and 26, the Philadelphia School District and the Archdiocese of Philadelphia canceled classes for all public and archdiocesan schools in the city of Philadelphia, as well as all archdiocesan schools in the nearby suburbs. Most suburban schools also were closed on both days. Due to the shifting track of the storm, the city of Philadelphia did not receive as much snow as had been predicted, with totals only approaching 4 to 6 inches (10 to 15 cm). However, suburbs to the north and east of the city, the Lehigh Valley, and The Poconos did receive snow in excess of 12 inches (30 cm).

Whiteout conditions and multiple crashes in the early morning of February 26 forced an indefinite closure of the Pennsylvania Turnpike in both directions between Carlisle and Breezewood.

At 6:00 p.m. on February 26, the Pennsylvania Turnpike Commission implemented a 45 mph (72 km/h) speed limit between the Ohio state line and the Breezewood exit, a distance of 161 miles (259 km).

On Friday, PPL reported several hundred people without power, most of them in Schuylkill County. Met-Ed reported power outages in Adams, Lebanon and Berks counties.

In Pittsburgh, total snowfall accumulations varied between 6 and 12 inches (15 and 30 cm). Overall, areas to the southwest of the city received lesser accumulations while mountainous areas to the east received substantially higher accumulations. The storm created major traffic-related issues on the city's major transportation arteries, including Interstates 79, 279, and 376.

=== Rhode Island ===
Drenching rains from the storm may have caused a retaining wall in a Providence parking lot to collapse, leading to a washout of the ground underneath.

=== West Virginia ===
Blizzard conditions and heavy snowfall in the eastern mountains of the state bordering Maryland led the West Virginia Department of Transportation to close a portion of Interstate 68. A Blizzard Warning was posted as far south as Bluefield, West Virginia.

=== Canada ===
Over 50 cm (20 in) of snow was reported in some areas of Quebec, with over 100,000 residents suffering power outages on February 26. Snowfall amounts of over 20 cm (7.9 in) were recorded in parts of southern Ontario, especially in the Niagara region. Strong winds gusting up to 120 km/h (75 mph) and heavy rain and snow were reported on the 26th in Nova Scotia and New Brunswick. Snowsqualls combined with bands of westward-progressing snow over Ontario to produce heavy snow as well as periods of freezing rain in some locations.

== "Snowicane" controversy ==
Prior to the storm the Accuweather forecast called for winds gusting to 70 mph (110 km/h) in some locations and predicted that coastal flooding and power outages would occur. They used words such as "hurricane-like conditions" and "snowicane" to describe the upcoming event. The National Weather Service forecast called for less severe conditions. National Weather Service meteorologist Craig Evanego said the use of these terms was not responsible, could lead to panic and noted that "snowicane" was not in the glossary of meteorology. The Weather Channel called the use of the term "bad meteorology". Accuweather defended the use of the terms, saying their forecasts are geared toward the general public and these terms were used to make the event more understandable to them. It was also noted that the barometric pressure would be equivalent to that of a Category 2 hurricane.

== See also ==
- List of Regional Snowfall Index Category 4 winter storms
- North American blizzard of 2009
- February 5–6, 2010 North American blizzard
- February 9–10, 2010 North American blizzard
- March 2010 North American winter storm
- Winter storms of 2009–2010
