= February 9–10, 2010 North American blizzard =

Severe weather event

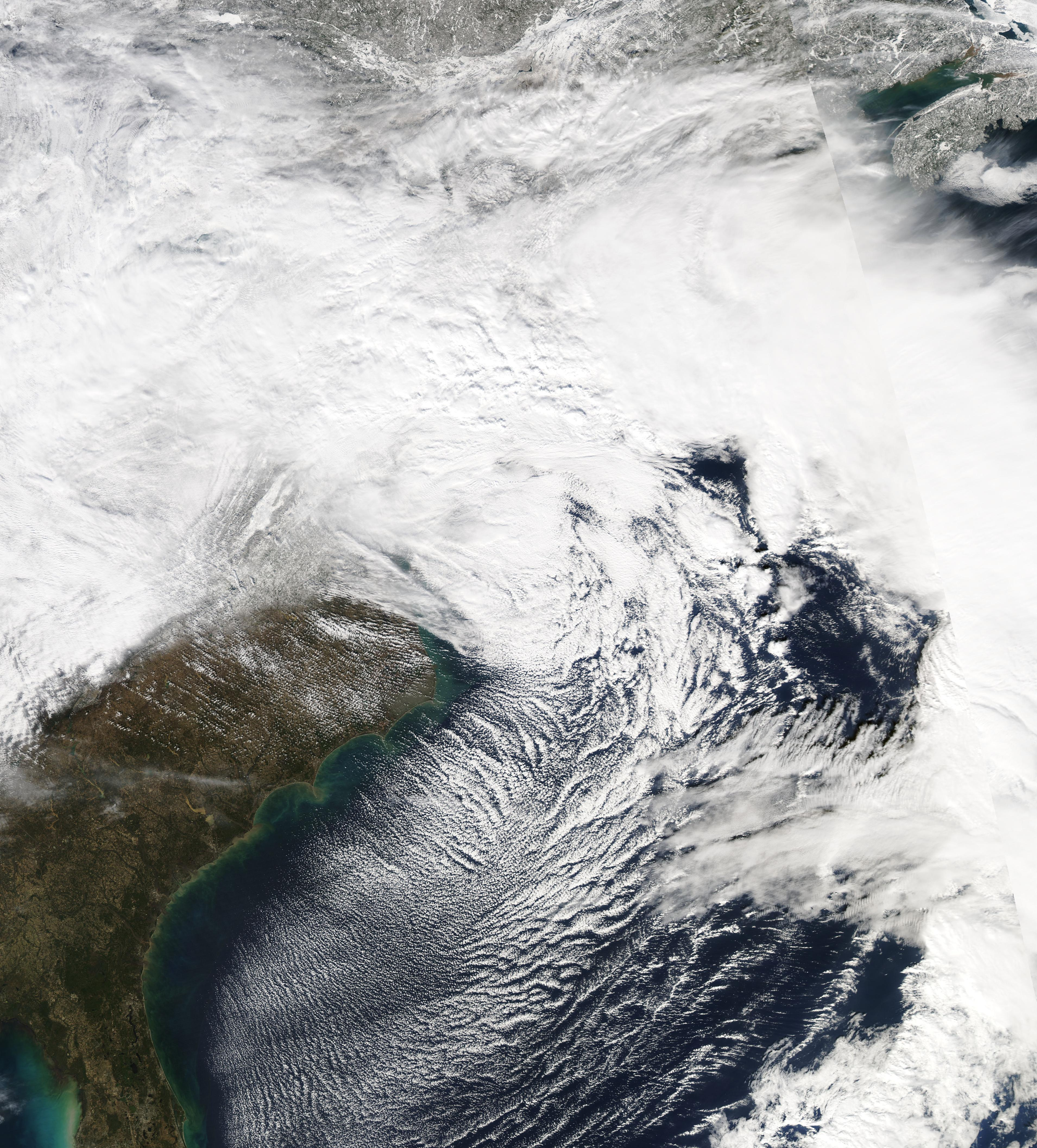
- The blizzard affecting the Northeastern U.S. late on February 10

Meteorological history
- Formed: February 7, 2010
- Exited land: February 10, 2010
- Dissipated: February 14, 2010

Category 2 "Minor" blizzard
- Regional snowfall index: 3.12 (NOAA)
- Lowest pressure: 969 mbar (hPa); 28.61 inHg
- Max. snowfall: 27.5 in (70 cm) in Orrtanna, Pennsylvania

Overall effects
- Fatalities: 3
- Areas affected: Midwestern United States, Mid-Atlantic region, and New England (from Illinois to Virginia to Vermont); Eastern Canada
- Part of the 2009–10 North American winter

The February 9–10, 2010 North American blizzard was a powerful blizzard that afflicted the Midwest, Mid-Atlantic and New England regions of the United States between February 9–11, 2010, affecting some of the same regions that had experienced a historic blizzard just three days earlier. The storm brought 10 to 20 inches (25 to 51 cm) of snow across a wide swath from Washington, D.C., to New York City, with parts of the Baltimore metro area receiving more than 20 inches (51 cm). This storm began as a classic "Alberta clipper", starting out in Canada and then moving southeast, and finally curving northeast while rapidly intensifying off the New Jersey coast, forming an eye. The National Weather Service likened this storm to a Category 1 hurricane: "Winds topped 58 mph over part of the Chesapeake Bay, and 40 mph gusts were common across the region as the storm's center deepened and drifted slowly along the mid-Atlantic coast". The storm system, in conjunction with the earlier storm, has been nicknamed "Snoverkill."

== History ==
This storm appeared similar to the North American blizzard of 2005 because it redeveloped off the Atlantic coast and intensified into a powerful nor'easter. This storm began around Big Bend of Texas on the morning of February 8. It moved northeast and reached the Tennessee Valley on the morning of February 9. At 7 p.m. EST, it was located near Charleston, South Carolina. It moved north-northeast on February 10, passing Norfolk, Virginia at 1 a.m. EST; Georgetown, Delaware, at 7 a.m. EST, Atlantic City, New Jersey, at 10 a.m. EST, and just east of Seaside Heights, New Jersey, at 4 p.m. EST. The low-pressure system then drifted slowly east into the afternoon and night.

== Impact ==
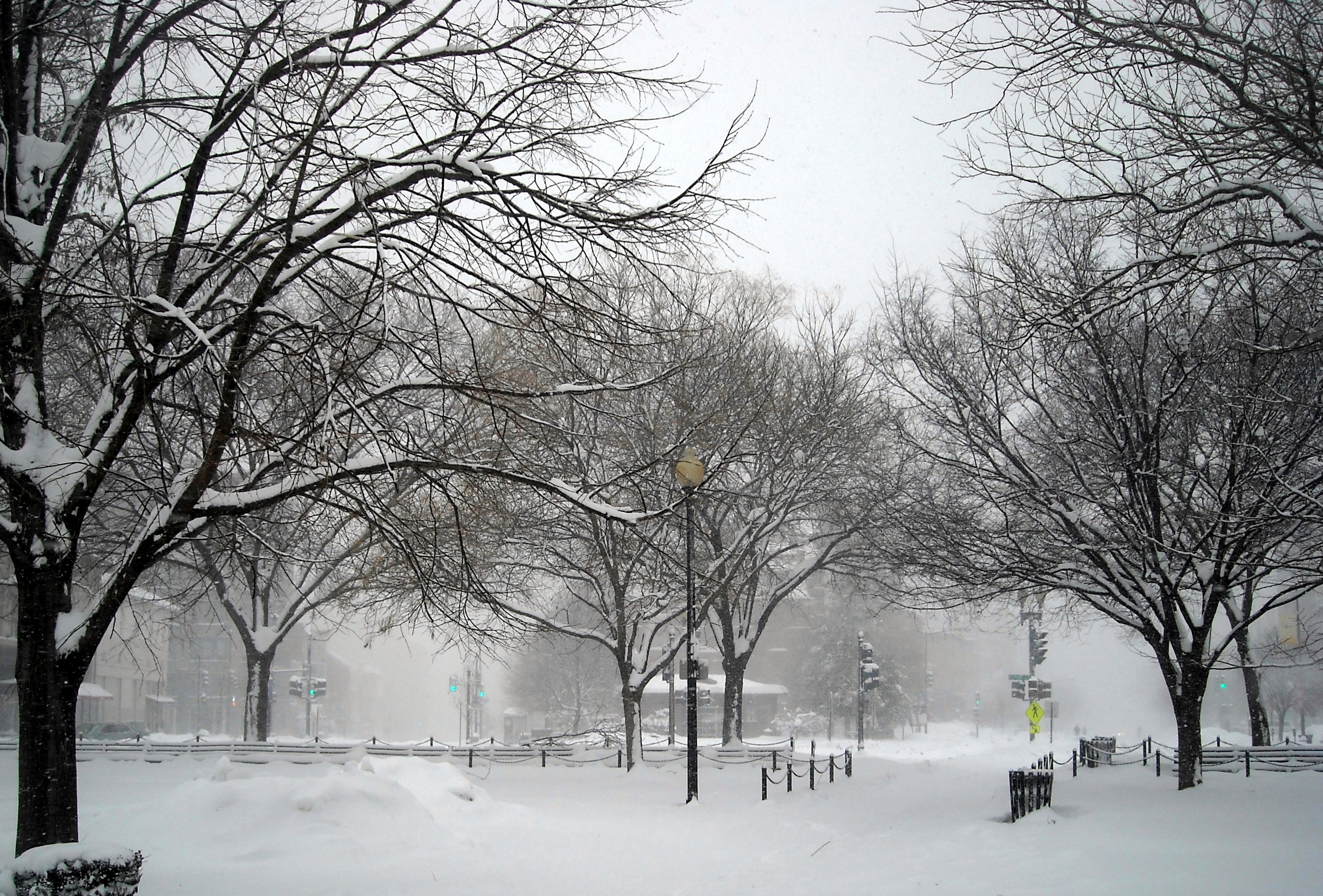
High winds and blowing snow in Dupont Circle, Washington, D.C., on February 10. Massachusetts Avenue, N.W., is visible on the right.

The storm affected some of the same areas that already received historic snow totals during the February 5–6, 2010 North American blizzard, slowing cleanup. Numerous cities shattered their seasonal snowfall records as of February 11, including:

Location	State	Storm total	Season-to-date snowfall as of February 11	Old record	Season
Wallops Island	VA	4.3 in (11 cm)	27.1 in (69 cm)	26.3 in (67 cm)	1995–96
Washington (Reagan National Airport)	DC	10.8 in (27 cm)	55.9 in (142 cm)	54.4 in (138 cm)	1898–99
Baltimore (BWI Airport)	MD	19.5 in (50 cm)	76.5 in (194 cm)	62.5 in (159 cm)	1995–96
Dulles International Airport	VA	9.3 in (24 cm)	72.8 in (185 cm)	61.9 in (157 cm)	1995–96
Wilmington	DE	12.8 in (33 cm)	66.7 in (169 cm)	55.9 in (142 cm)	1995–96
Philadelphia	PA	15.8 in (40 cm)	72.1 in (183 cm)	65.5 in (166 cm)	1995–96

On February 11, BWI and Dulles airports set new daily snow depth records of 34 in (86 cm) and 26 in (66 cm), respectively.

There were few places for city workers to put the plowed snow, since there are restrictions on dumping snow into bodies of water within most jurisdictions. Baltimore used empty parking lots, city parks, and the Pimlico Race Course. It dumped the snow in the Inner Harbor after securing permission to do so from the Maryland Department of the Environment.

The National Weather Service issued blizzard warnings from Washington, D.C., to Long Island, including New York City, as well as the entire Philadelphia metro area and the entire states of Maryland, Delaware, and New Jersey. Winter storm warnings for heavy snowfall were posted from Illinois to Massachusetts, and the federal government was closed for the third day in a row (and was closed again the next day, February 11). Many schools were closed, from those in the Washington, D.C., area, through Philadelphia, and into New York City (only the third snow day for New York City Public Schools since 2003).

A conference on consequences of global climate change sponsored by the Center for American Progress, the Global Implications of Climate Migration, scheduled for February 11 in Washington, D.C., was postponed.

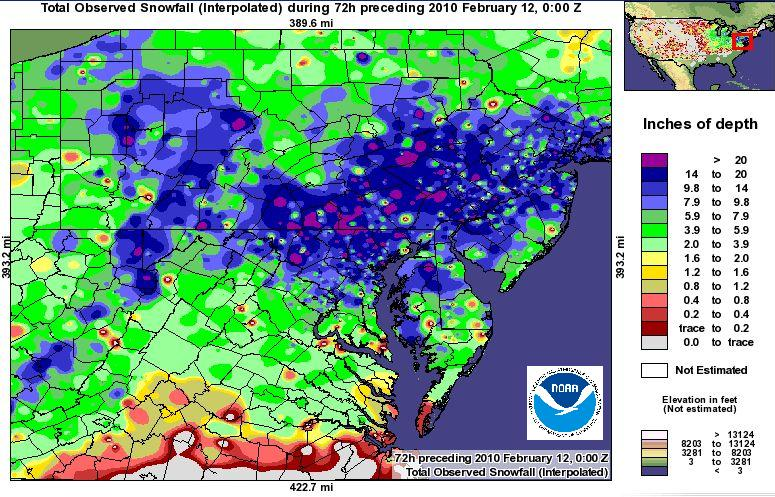
February 9–10, 2010 North American blizzard Mid Atlantic Snowfall accumulation.(From the National Weather Service)

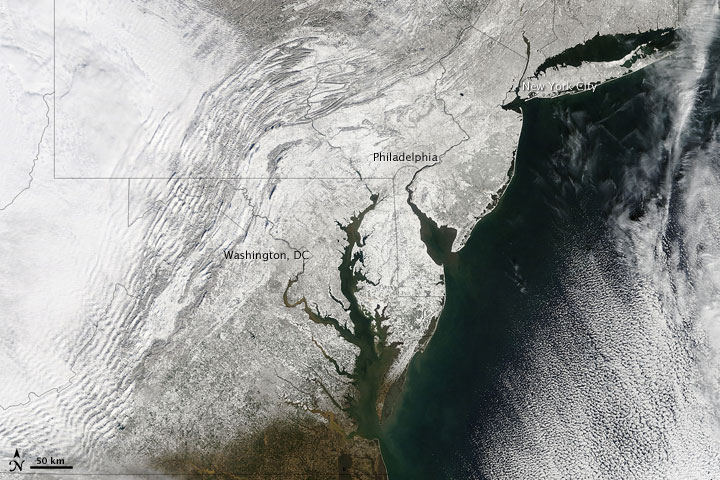
Satellite view of the area on February 12. (From NASA MODIS)

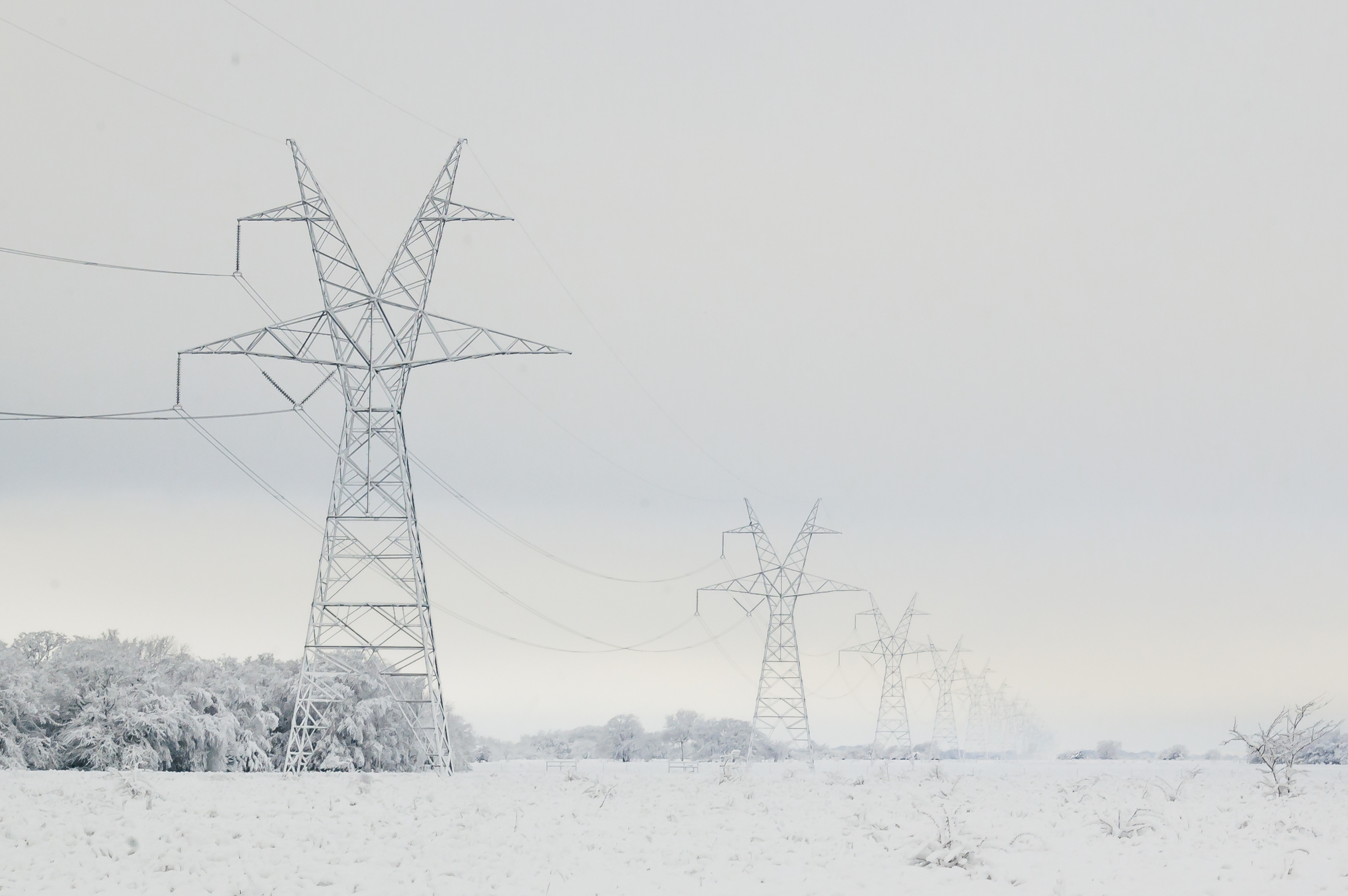
Transmission towers and power lines in East Texas snow from the 2010 North American Blizzard

=== Connecticut ===
Snowfall amounts varied greatly across Connecticut, ranging from 2 inches (5.1 cm) in its far north, to over 1 foot (30 cm) along the shoreline. Connecticut Governor M. Jodi Rell initiated an action plan with Hartford-area businesses and state offices for the staggered release of employees to avoid the risk of accidents and gridlock on snow-covered highways across the state. Heavy snow was responsible for numerous crashes, including one that closed Interstate 95 near the Rhode Island state line in North Stonington, Connecticut, and another on Interstate 395 near Plainfield. The snow also forced state and federal investigators to suspend their investigation of the Middletown power plant blast that occurred on February 7. The snow caused the cancellation of most flights into and out of Bradley International Airport, and Metro-North operated trains on a reduced schedule on February 10.

=== Pennsylvania ===
Around the local Philadelphia area, snow began during the early evening on the 9th. As warmer air moved in aloft, the snow changed to sleet and freezing rain between 3 a.m. and 6 a.m. EST on the 10th. Surface temperatures responded slower and the sleet and freezing rain changed over to rain during the morning of the 10th. Some sleet mixed in from time to time. As the low pressure system moved northeast of the region, the rain changed back to snow by Noon EST on the 10th and fell heavy at times during the afternoon. Winds also increased and started to down snow laden tree limbs and trees. The snow ended late in the evening on the 10th. In the rest of Eastern Pennsylvania, snow began during the evening of the 9th and fell at its heaviest from the late morning into the afternoon of the 10th. The snow ended during the evening of the 10th, dumping between 11 and 27 inches of snow across the state.

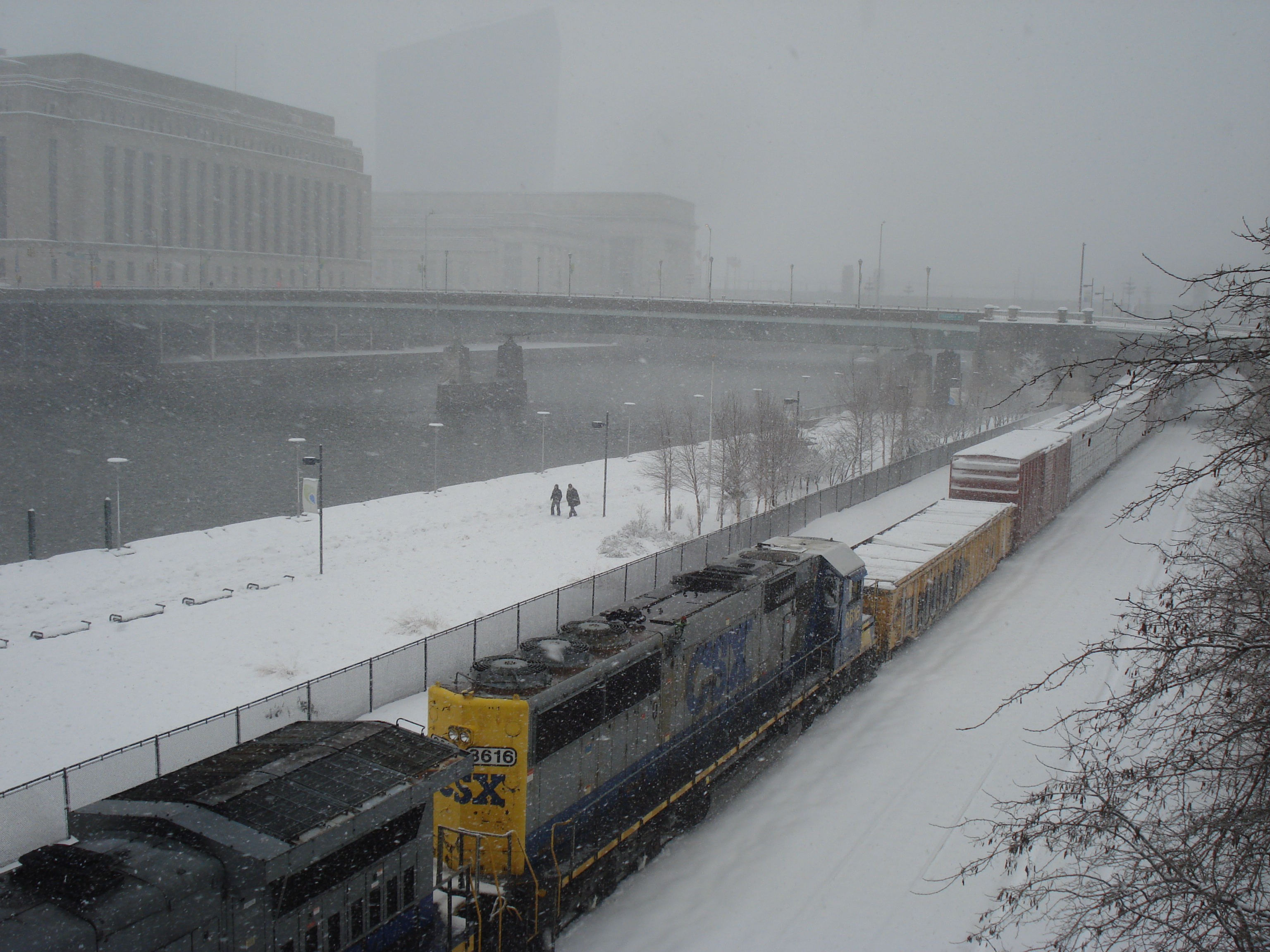
Blizzard conditions in Philadelphia on February 10. 30th Street Station and Cira Center barely visible from Walnut Street.

On the morning of February 10, 2010, Governor Ed Rendell ordered the activation of over 11,000 Pennsylvania National Guard soldiers statewide, including nearly 500 which deployed in the Harrisburg area to assist state police with stranded motorists, to deny non-essential vehicles access to closed highways, and to provide blankets, food, water and other supplies to anyone who needed it.

Also, all Philadelphia public and parochial schools closed February 10, 11, and 12th due to the snow and dig out. In addition, many utility companies suffered their worst power outages of all time. For example, PECO Energy suffered its 9th highest power outage since the ice storm of January 1994. About 225,000 homes and businesses lost power. Outages by county were 60,500 in Chester, 55,000 in Delaware, 47,650 Bucks, 44,700 in Montgomery and 17,000 in Philadelphia. All power was restored by the 13th. The utility replaced 56 miles of cable, 50 transformers, 51 poles, replaced or reconnected 8,000 fuses, and 1,550 pole top cross arms. Damage to the infrastructure was estimated at 15 million dollars.

In Lancaster, two people died after the snowmobile they were riding on collided with a moving vehicle at an intersection. In Clearfield County, two pileups involving about 25 vehicles on snowy Interstate 80 left at least one man dead and 18 people injured.

Snowfall totals in the Pittsburgh area generally ranged between 5 and 9 inches, but high winds created near-blizzard conditions during the morning hours of February 10. The new accumulations coupled with blowing and drifting snow exacerbated major problems created by the February 5–6, 2010 North American blizzard. Accumulations in mountainous areas to the south and east of the city were over 1 foot.

=== Virginia ===
Near Williamsburg, Virginia, whiteout conditions around 9:00 am EST, February 10, led to a fifty-car pileup on a stretch of westbound I-64. The accident took hours to clear, and seven people suffered minor injuries requiring hospitalization.

=== New Jersey ===
Northeastern parts of the state experienced snow totals of up to 24 inches. Places such as Middlesex County northward experienced 18 to 24 inches of snow from the storm. Many areas of Northern New Jersey experienced power outages. Some residents were left without power for days. The National Weather Service called a state of emergency. Blizzard conditions were a hazard for many across the Garden State Parkway and the New Jersey Turnpike. Blizzard conditions were reported in major cities around New Jersey. With the "eye" off the shoreline, the entire state dealt with rain, ice and heavy snow inundating the area. Schools were closed for up to 5 days, a rare scenario. Snow at times fell 1–3 inches every hour in South Jersey.

New Jersey was hard hit in many ways. Some suburbs reported thundersnow, which is the meteorological term for thunder and lightning in a snowstorm. Newark Liberty International Airport, Camden County Airport, LaGuardia and JFK Airports had more than 4 hour delays and some terminals were brought to a standstill. The winds were a factor with onshore winds reported to be as strong as 60 mph. The National Guard told people to stay off the roads for safety reasons. A wintry mix along with rainfall pounded the shore cities of New Jersey such as Atlantic City. I-95 southbound was icy and very hard to travel because snow, sleet and rain all fell at once. Visibility was also an issue for travelers as whiteout conditions were happening statewide. The New York Metro was busy other days but in the record breaking blizzard it was halted.

Rutgers University cancelled classes for the first time since the 2006 snowstorm on February 10.

== Snowfall totals by state ==
List of highest snowfall accumulations during the February 9–10, 2010, blizzard
State	Location	Amount
Connecticut	Greenwich	10.0 in (25 cm)
Washington D.C.	American University	14.0 in (36 cm)
Delaware	Wilmington	12.8 in (33 cm)
Maryland	Eldersburg	24.0 in (61 cm)
New Jersey	Bricktown, Hopewell, Kingwood	18.0 in (46 cm)
New York	Woodmere	16.4 in (42 cm)
Pennsylvania	Orrtanna	27.5 in (70 cm)
Rhode Island	Charlestown	6.2 in (16 cm)
Virginia	1 mile east-northeast of Falls Church	13.4 in (34 cm)
West Virginia	1 mile east-northeast of Martinsburg	16.0 in (41 cm)
Alabama	Green Hill, 2.8 miles north-northwest of Rogersville	4.5 in (11 cm)
Arkansas	2 miles south of Kingston	10.0 in (25 cm)
Iowa	Hampton	13.0 in (33 cm)
Illinois	3 miles south-southeast of Deerfield	13.1 in (33 cm)
Indiana	0.8 miles northwest of Jeffersonville	4.5 in (11 cm)
Kansas	Fulton	5.5 in (14 cm)
Kentucky	Dawson Springs, Owensboro	7.0 in (18 cm)
Michigan	3 miles east of Battle Creek	12.0 in (30 cm)
Minnesota	3 miles east of Finland	15.4 in (39 cm)
Missouri	3 miles north-northeast of Downing	6.5 in (17 cm)
Mississippi	Olive Branch	8.0 in (20 cm)
Ohio	Cleves	9.2 in (23 cm)
Oklahoma	Burns Flat, Calumet, 3 miles northwest of Cordell, Geary	4.0 in (10 cm)
South Dakota	Millbank, Sisseton	6.0 in (15 cm)
Tennessee	5 miles north of Millington	8.0 in (20 cm)
Texas	Beaver, 12 miles northeast of Channing, Perryton	4.0 in (10 cm)
Wisconsin	Cornucopia	6.0 in (15 cm)

== See also ==
- February 5–6, 2010 North American blizzard
- February 25–27, 2010 North American blizzard
- March 2010 North American winter storm
- North American blizzard of 2009
- Winter storms of 2009-2010
