= 2009–2010 El Niño event =

Meteorological event in the Pacific Ocean

A moderate or strong El Niño event took place in the Central Pacific Ocean and was one of the strongest such events. This event had the highest anomaly in the Pacific. Because of the location in the Pacific, the 2009 and 2010 El Niño was classified as warm pool.

This El Niño had a hard influence on the 2009 Atlantic hurricane season in which there were only nine named storms from Ana to Ida. Furthermore, in 2009 no hurricanes struck the United States. In the Western Caribbean Sea, however, Hurricane Ida struck eastern Nicaragua, Belize and the Mexican Yucatán Peninsula as a Category 1 or 2 cyclone. The storm later became a nor'easter and pounded the East Coast of the United States, causing $300 million to $500 million in actual damage..

Other effects in the 2009 and 2010 event were record snowfalls across the Great Lakes states, Mid-Atlantic and New England.

The Southeastern United States recorded very wet conditions during the 2009–10 events.
