= Southern Maine Coast =

Region of Maine, United States

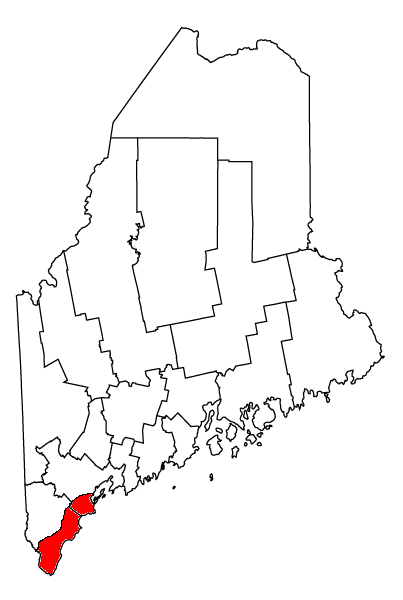
South Coastal Maine highlighted

Southern Maine Coast is a region of the U.S. state of Maine. It commonly includes the coastal areas of York County and Cumberland County. Some notable towns are Biddeford, Kittery, York, Wells, Ogunquit, Kennebunk, Kennebunkport, Saco, Old Orchard Beach and Scarborough. The region also contains Portland, the largest city in the state.

One of the first parts of Maine to be settled, early in the nineteenth century, the region was one of the most prosperous in the United States being a ship building and trading center, and much architecture survives from this era. Today the Southern Maine Coast is the heart of Maine's tourism industry, containing 90% of the state's sandy beaches.
