= February 2009 British Isles snowfall =

Prolonged snowfall in the UK and Ireland

February 2009 Great Britain and Ireland snowfall
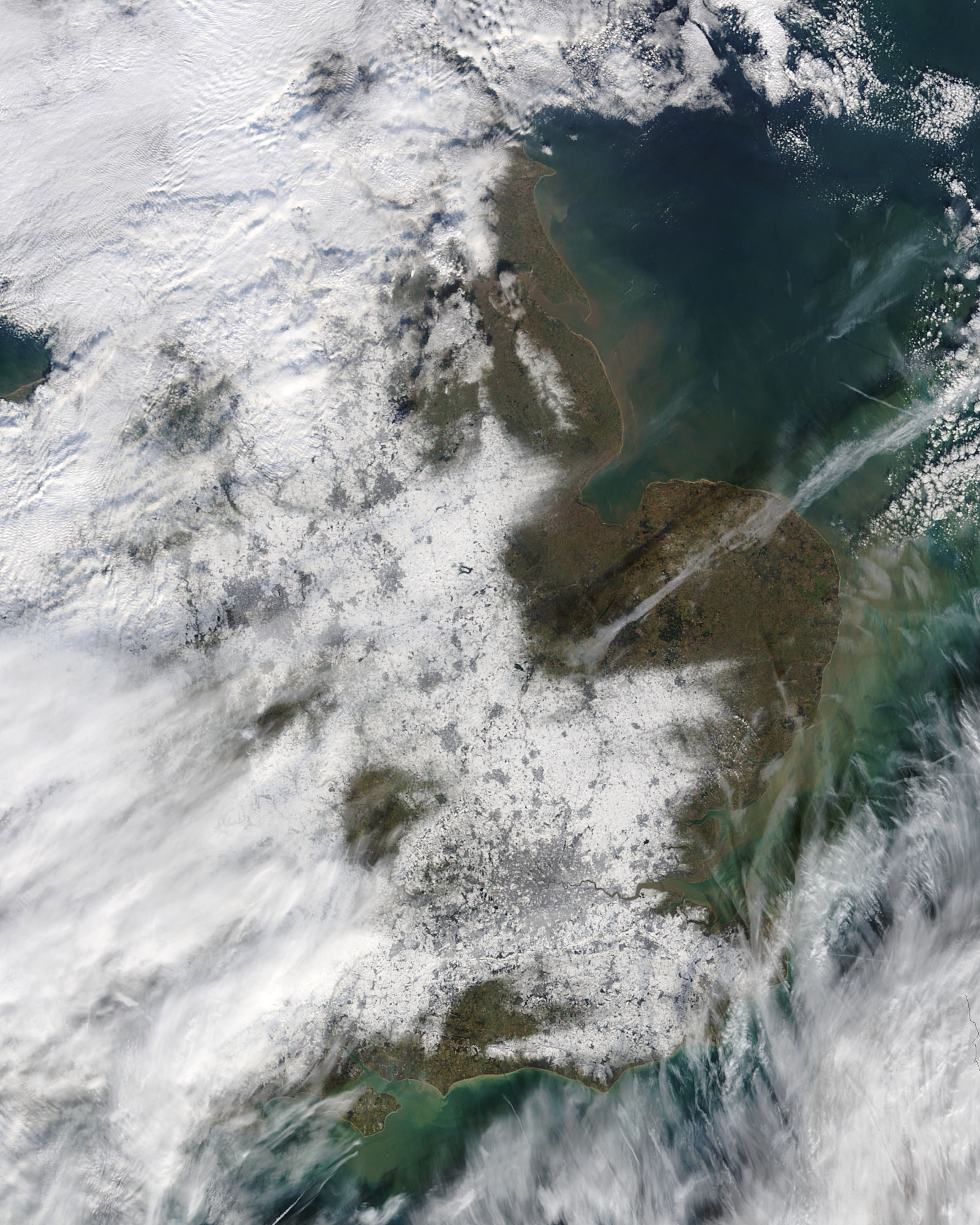
- Satellite image of the snowfall in England and Wales (Click here for false colour image)

Meteorological history
- Formed: 1 February 2009
- Dissipated: 13 February 2009

Winter storm
- Lowest pressure: 992 mbar (hPa)
- Lowest temp: −18.4 °C (−1.1 °F) in Aviemore, Scotland
- Max. snowfall: 55 cm (22 in) in Okehampton, Devon

Overall effects
- Fatalities: At least 4
- Damage: £1.3 billion (US$2.1 billion)
- Areas affected: British Isles and parts of Western Europe

A prolonged period of snowfall began in Great Britain and Ireland on 1 February 2009. Some areas experienced their largest snowfall levels in 18 years. Snow fell over much of Western Europe. The United Kingdom's Met Office and Ireland's Met Éireann issued severe weather warnings in anticipation of the snowfall. More than 30 centimetres (12 in) of snow fell on parts of the North Downs and over 20 cm (8 in) in parts of the London area. Such snow accumulation is uncommon in London. On the morning of 6 February the majority of Great Britain and Ireland had snow cover, with the area surrounding the Bristol Channel (South Wales: Cardiff area; and South West England: Bristol area) being most affected: 55 cm (22 in) had settled overnight around Okehampton, Devon, South West England with similar depths in South Wales. In Ireland the highest totals were recorded around East Kildare and County Wicklow where up to 28 cm (11 in) fell around Naas, County Kildare and even more along the Wicklow Mountains. The last time such widespread snowfall affected Britain was in February 1991. On the 2nd a total of 32 cm (13 in) had fallen in Leatherhead, Surrey just south of the M25. Also 30 cm (12 in) had fallen over the South Downs and 26 cm (10 in) in higher areas of Brighton.

On 2 February, all London Buses were removed from service and there were severe delays on London Underground. All train services on Southeastern railway services between London, Kent and East Sussex were cancelled, as were those on Southern. South West Trains operated an emergency timetable with reduced service. Severe disruption occurred on First Capital Connect services, c2c services, First Great Western services, National Express East Anglia and Eurostar services from St Pancras International. In Ireland Dublin Bus routes were also severely disrupted while in England all bus services in Brighton, Crawley and Royal Tunbridge Wells had been severely disrupted.

Heathrow Airport was closed and British Airways cancelled all departures for a period. London City, Luton, Aberdeen, Bristol, Cardiff, Birmingham and Southampton were also affected. The Gatwick Express railway service was suspended. In Ireland on 5 February Dublin Airport was closed for a period to allow snow to be cleared from the runways, delaying flights. Flights at the airport were cancelled the following day.

Other effects included lost work time and disruption to education. Costs, mainly in terms of lost work time, are estimated to amount to around £1.2 billion, although this may be underestimated. The adverse weather conditions caused schools in some areas of the United Kingdom to close during 2, 3 and 5 February in the Midlands.

A winter storm swept across the south of England on 9–10 February bringing heavy rain and snow, which caused flooding in southern England. In France, Paris's Charles de Gaulle Airport was closed. In Aviemore, in the Scottish Highlands, a temperature of −18.4 °C (−1.1 °F) — according to the Met Office, was recorded; the lowest temperature recorded in the UK since 2003.

The maximum depth of the event was 55 cm (22 in) in Okehampton, Devon on 6 February. Other high amounts were Drybrook, Gloucestershire which had on 2 February 32 cm (13 in) reported in Leatherhead, 28 cm (11 in) in Purley, 25 cm (10 in) in Croydon, 20 cm (8 in) in Greater London, 30 cm (12 in) on the South Downs, 18 cm (7 in) in Brighton and 26 cm (10 in) on higher areas of Brighton.

The weather conditions severely disrupted the month's sporting schedule.

== Synopsis ==
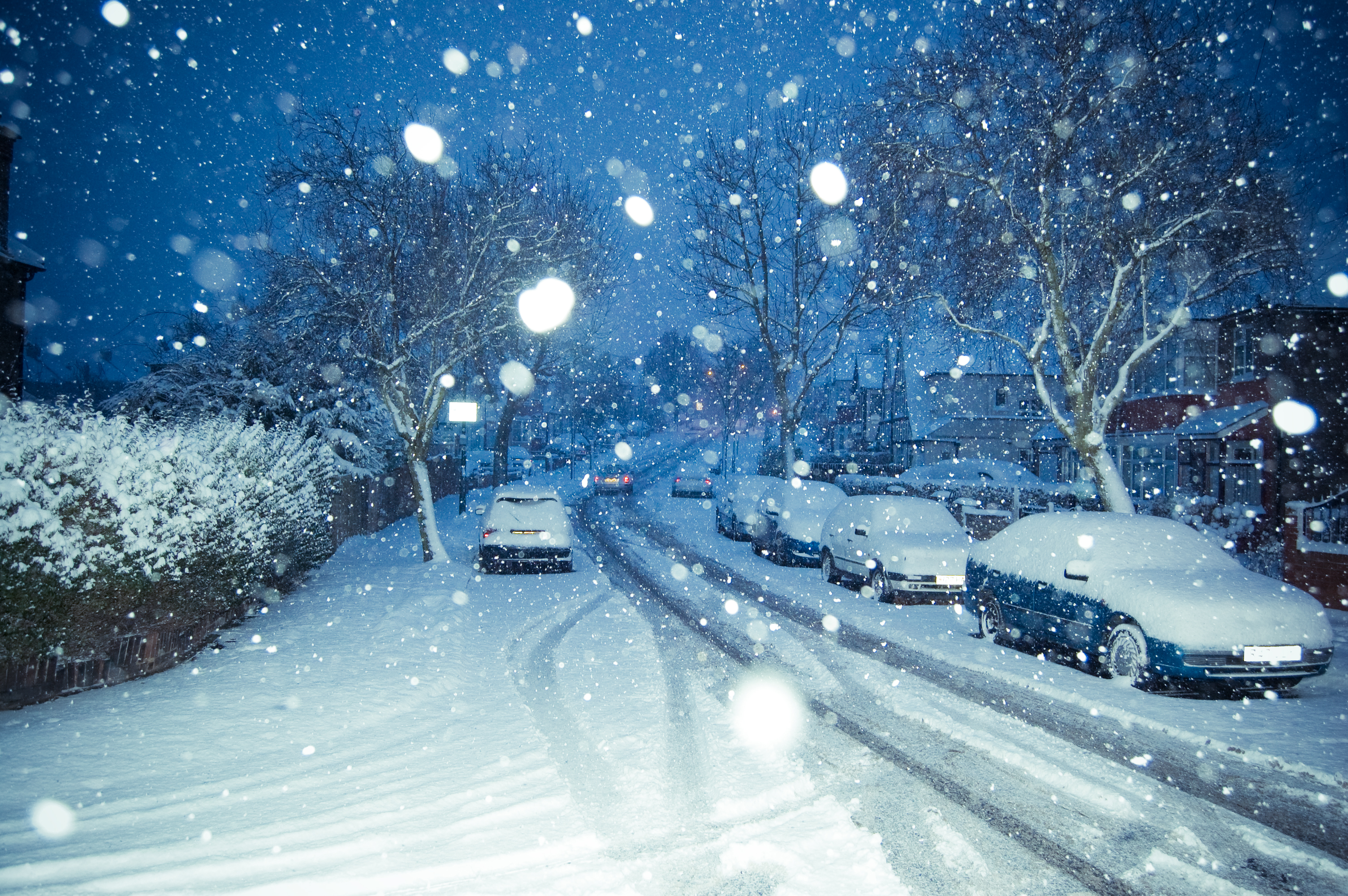
Snow falling in London, 2 February 2009

The February 2009 snowstorm followed an intense Sudden stratospheric warming in the previous month. These events often help to set up surface weather patterns that give rise to cold spells and snowfall in Europe. The snow then resulted from several factors starting on 1 February, the main component of which was a strong low pressure area near Spain. A strong high pressure area over Scandinavia created a tight pressure gradient between the two systems. A cold front also was tracking over Britain at this time. After passing through the region, cold air set in behind it, enhanced by an upper-level low over Germany. An inverted trough then extended out from the cold front, bringing precipitation to England. Late on 2 February, a surface-low pressure system, the actual snow storm, developed over the English Channel.

== Effects ==
=== School closures ===
- Over 4,500 schools across the United Kingdom were closed on 3 February and the reasons given were mostly either accessibility or heating problems, although the blanket closures across whole districts demonstrate that this was not always the case. All schools in West Yorkshire, including all 197 in the City of Bradford district were closed, while Leeds City Council said it was the headteacher's decision whether a school opened. One school in Halifax, Calderdale, West Yorkshire remained closed from 2 to 6 February. Schools in Ireland were also affected.
- All of Surrey's 403 schools closed on 2 and 3 February. 500 schools closed in Wales as up to 15 cm (6 in) of snow fell in some areas.
- Most of the schools in East and West Sussex were closed on 2 and 3 February, nearly all schools in Brighton were closed on 2 and 3 February.
- Every school in the boroughs of Birmingham, Dudley and Solihull in the West Midlands was shut, after a decision was taken the previous day, while more than 200 other schools in the area were closed. 110 schools were not open on 2 February and many of the decisions on keeping the schools shut for a second day were taken during the same day.
- In Scotland, all 74 schools in the Borders were shut for two days. More than 250 schools were closed across the south-west, with some areas under 10 cm (4 in) of snow.
- The majority of schools reopened on 4 February, although around 200 remained closed in Wales while other regions saw up to 100 closures.
- On 5 February, over 500 schools closed due to snow in the English Midlands
- In Ireland, schools across the country were shut from 2 February onwards, with the worst affected areas being County Donegal, County Carlow, County Kilkenny and County Meath.

The school closures in the United Kingdom prompted negative comments from parents who were unhappy about the "confusing and contradictory" messages they received. Some laid the blame of the excessive closures: not on the public's actual ability to make alternative travel arrangements - to 'cope', but on council and school administrators' having an unhelpful risk-averse 'health and safety driven' legal attitude. Other concerns included parents having to take time off work when the weather was not quite as bad as it seemed.

Swansea University was closed on Tuesday 3 February through concern of the safety of students and staff using icy roads. The University of Exeter was closed from 15:00 on Friday 6 February because of icy conditions on its hilly campus, while the University of the West of England in Bristol and neighbouring institutions the University of Bath and Bath Spa University were closed on Thursday 5th and Friday 6th for similar reasons. .

=== Flooding ===
On 9 February, heavy rain and melting snow caused flooding in southern England, exacerbated by high tides which trapped water in river systems. Heavy snow and floods closed roads in Cornwall, Devon, Oxfordshire, Somerset, Hampshire and Sussex. Areas of Gloucestershire, Herefordshire and Worcestershire endured power cuts because of damage caused by the weight of snow on equipment or trees falling onto power lines. In Somerset, 20 people were rescued from their cars in Taunton and Yeovil because of floods, and rivers burst their banks.

=== Transport ===
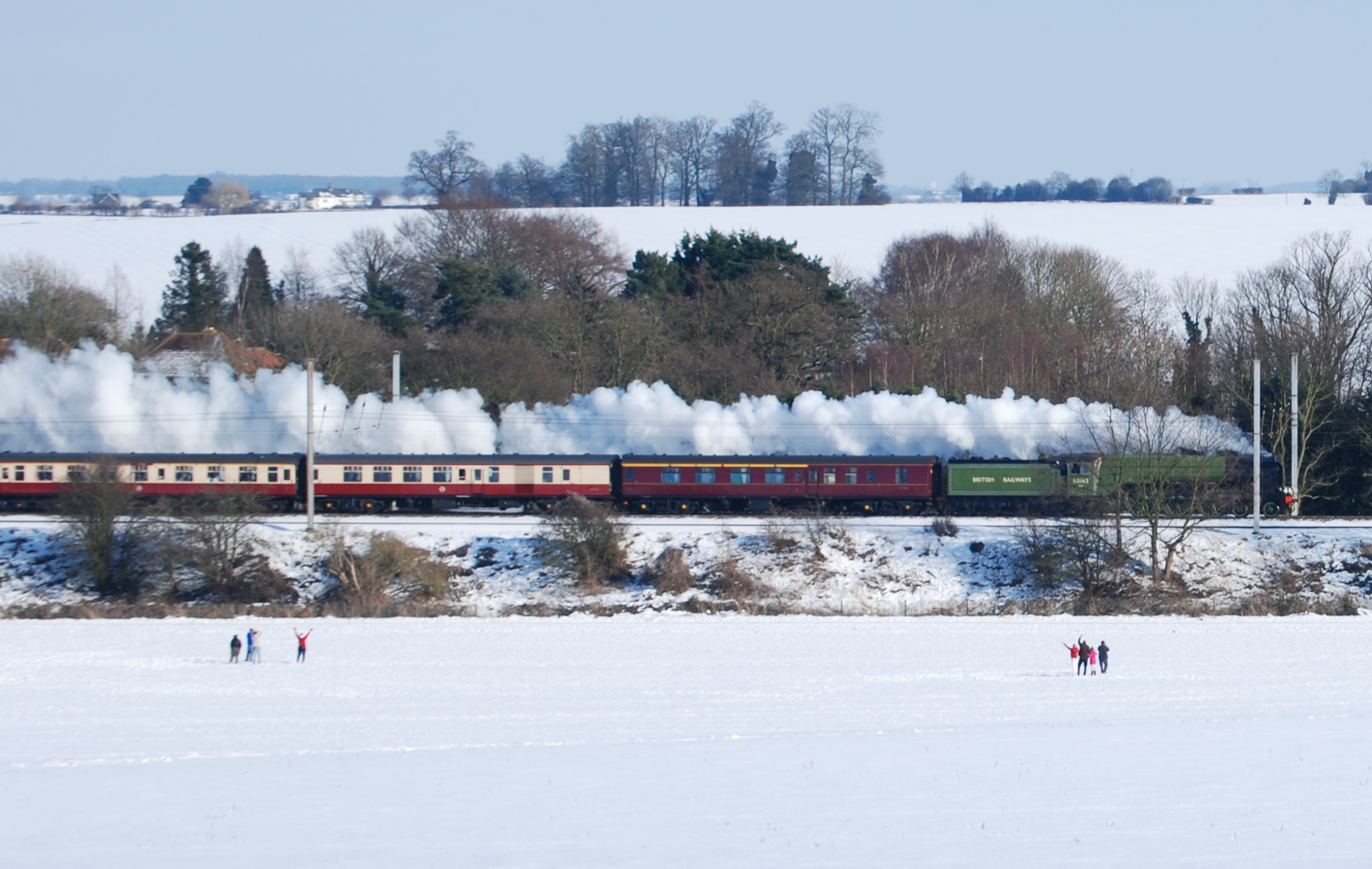
The snow provided an almost continuous photographic backdrop for the historic 250-mile run of the brand new steam locomotive No. 60163 Tornado hauling The Talisman from Darlington to London on 7 February. It is seen here passing through Hertfordshire

Transport links in many parts of the regions were greatly affected by the bad weather. Railway services were reduced in frequency, with the south-east of England most affected, but were reintroduced over the following two days. South West Trains's services to and from Waterloo were disrupted, as were Southeastern and Southern trains services from Kent and the South Coast. By 3 February, only the District line saw route delays through London.

Many rural and urban bus services in Britain and Ireland were suspended. Transport for London reported that several bus routes had been "suspended or redirected" due to blocked roads. All buses were cancelled on 2 February after 20 buses slid off the road the previous day. London did not have enough snowploughs to cope with the widespread problems.

In Ireland Dublin Bus experienced delays on 3 February, particularly in the southside of the city, around Lucan, Tallaght, Rathfarnham and Enniskerry. No buses were able to gain access to Lucan village or estates in Tallaght. Dublin's M50 experienced severe delays throughout with many commuters reporting lengthy periods until they reached their homes following work.

In other areas buses generally took amended routes, avoiding side roads or rural lanes and using only main roads.

In England and Wales both Severn crossings were closed on 6 February because ice began falling from overhead gantries, affecting both the M4 and M48 motorways across the Severn Estuary; traffic was diverted into Gloucestershire and onto the M50. This was the first closure because of a weather-related incident of the second Severn crossing since the structure opened in 1996. They reopened on 10 February.

The A23 between Brighton and Haywards Heath saw severe disruption on 2 February and the A27 through Brighton was closed because of the huge volume of snowfall.

=== Air traffic delays ===
"I have to admit that it's an irony to return home to snow but I've come to like it."

— Explorer Mark Pollock who, having become the first blind person to reach the South Pole, endured a delay of hours due to the snow at Dublin Airport.

Heathrow Airport closed both of its runways; one was later reopened. British Airways cancelled all departures. London City, Luton and Southampton Airports were closed. The Gatwick Express railway service was suspended. Temporary closures also affected other international airports at Cardiff, Birmingham and Bristol.

On 5 February heavy snowfalls closed Dublin Airport in Ireland, leading to the cancellation of approximately half the flight operation or almost 200 flights. The airport closed at 01:00, blaming slippery runways, and flights were diverted to other airports. It reopened at 19:45 that evening but flights were disrupted by the weather again the following day.

=== Casualties ===
The icy conditions led to many casualties on roads and exposed areas. Hospitals across the region reported great increases in injuries sustained from falling in the snow as large numbers of people came outside to partake in the winter weather. Sites across south-central England, covering Berkshire, Buckinghamshire, Oxfordshire, Hampshire and the Isle of Wight, reported that their emergency departments were very busy with minor injuries, with figures of more than one-quarter of all patients suffering falls.

- Two military helicopters were called in to assist ambulance crews in Devon and Cornwall, some parts of which were under 4 cm (2 in) of snow and claimed to be cut off. North Devon District Hospital and several hospitals in the region cancelled all outpatient appointments, while others in the area restricted their services to emergencies only.
- In Kelty in Fife, Scotland, two ambulance crew members were injured when the vehicle overturned on the A909 en route to an emergency call on 2 February.
- Five girls were involved in an accident while sledging on a makeshift sledge, reported by BBC News Online to have been the roof of an old Land Rover, at Rother Valley Country Park in South Yorkshire. One was airlifted to Sheffield Northern General Hospital, where she was pronounced dead, while the others went by ambulance, having sustained non-critical injuries.
- Three men were injured while sledging at Devil's Dyke in West Sussex and were rescued by a 4 x 4 support vehicle.
- In the West Midlands of England, two men were airlifted to hospital after injuring themselves in separate accidents, one at Baggeridge Country Park in Sedgley.
- On 2 February, four road accidents were reported on one stretch in County Sligo, Ireland.
- Amidst heavy snowfalls on the Wicklow Mountains in Ireland, four motorists became stranded in two 4X4 vehicles in the Sally Gap on 3–4 February. Mountain rescuers on skis had brought them food and blankets until they could be airlifted to Blessington.
- Around 200 motorists had to be rescued in Devon on 6 February, after their vehicles became stranded in heavy snow.
- A mother gave birth to twins in Devon after firefighters were mobilised to her aid when ambulances and rescue helicopters were hindered by the snow.

=== Deaths ===
- A man died of hypothermia in Aberdeen where the temperature dropped to −18.4 °C (−1.1 °F).
- A man was killed in a car crash at Sandy Bridge in Llanelli, Wales on 2 February.
- A 16-year-old girl died whilst sledging down a hill on a car bonnet near Rotherham, South Yorkshire.
- A 6-year-old boy died after falling through an iced-over pond at Streethouse, West Yorkshire on 7 February. He was airlifted to Pinderfields Hospital in Wakefield, but later died.

=== News coverage ===
News coverage of the snow received very high ratings, with over 7 million watching the BBC's 18:00 and 22:00 news programmes. The BBC News channel received its biggest audience since the 2007 London car bombs, and their website was sent 35,000 pictures and videos from people of the snow, their highest number ever.

=== Sporting changes and disruptions ===
The region's sporting schedule for the early and latter parts of the week was severely affected by the extreme weather conditions. Sports such as hurling, camogie, gaelic football, association football, rugby union, rugby league, horse racing, motorsports and fox hunting were all disrupted in various ways summarised below.

- The English FA Cup fourth-round replay between Arsenal and Cardiff City in North London was postponed, as were Football League Championship matches involving London sides Queens Park Rangers and Crystal Palace.
- Sixteen out of twenty-four matches in Football League's One and Two were cancelled on 3 February, as was an FA Trophy match.
- The winter football transfer window for Premier League clubs in Scotland and England, which had already been extended due to 31 January falling on a Saturday rather than a midweek day, was provisionally altered so that clubs could complete transfers. Clubs had to provide evidence that a transfer could not be completed before the 17:00 deadline because of the weather. Leeds United had to miss out on the signing of Liam Dickinson because the transfer papers came at 17:14, 14 minutes after the deadline because of the weather.
- Horse-racing events scheduled for 3 February were cancelled at Market Rasen, Sedgefield and Southwell and the meeting at Ludlow (scheduled for 4 February) was cancelled the same day.
- In rugby union the England Saxons vs Ireland A match was cancelled.
- In rugby league, Halifax vs Blackpool Panthers, London Skolars vs Dewsbury Rams and Oldham R.L.F.C. vs Rochdale Hornets had to rearrange their Northern Rail Cup fixtures. Of the three Super League games due to take place during the weekend of 6–8 February, Leeds Rhinos vs Crusaders and Wigan Warriors vs Wakefield Trinity Wildcats went ahead, but Harlequins RL vs Bradford Bulls had to be postponed due to a frozen pitch.
- The France national rugby union team were stranded at Dublin Airport on 5 February as they arrived in Ireland ahead of their Six Nations Championship match in Croke Park the following day.
- The football fixtures were disrupted again on 7–8 February. Games in the Football League Championship between Barnsley - Crystal Palace, Charlton Athletic - Cardiff City and Watford - Southampton were all called off. Only three matches were played in Football League One after eight were postponed and it was a similar story in Football League Two with just five matches going ahead, while in the Conference National, only two matches were played. Several matches were called off in Scotland, at Airdrie, Aberdeen (both Scottish Cup), Elgin (Division Three) and Peterhead (Division Two).
- On 8 February Gaelic football and hurling fixtures in Ireland's Allianz National League were disrupted by that day's fall of snow. Eleven games were postponed in the Allianz NHL: Galway v Kilkenny, Offaly v Carlow, Laois v Down, Meath v Kildare, Wicklow v Armagh, Donegal v Longford, Tyrone v Fingal, Sligo v Monaghan, Laois v Down, Cavan v Fermanagh and Roscommon v London. One match in the Allianz NFL was postponed for the same reason, Leitrim v Carlow.
- All camogie fixtures were cancelled and in the Leinster Under-21 Football Championship 3 games were cancelled: Wicklow v Longford, Wexford v Kildare and Louth v Dublin.
- In motorsports, the Irish Championship Rallycross at Mondello Park was cancelled.
- A point-to point meeting in Gorey, County Wexford in Ireland was cancelled.
- The Island Hunt Foxhounds was cancelled on 8 February.

== Reaction ==
In some regions of Britain, the response to the adverse weather conditions was considered an unnecessary panic – the Devon and Cornwall Business Council stated: "We have had too many businesses closed unnecessarily because people were panicked by the weather forecast. (...) We have had too many schools closed down, which has an adverse impact on people who rely on carers to look after children. (...) I think we have over-reacted quite significantly." It has been estimated that the weather cost the region's small businesses £40m.

== Aftermath ==
In the wake of London's bus service closures, an inquiry was held into the inability of London's local authorities to work with public transport service providers.

== See also ==
- Global storm activity of 2008
- Winter of 2009–2010 in Europe
  - Winter of 2009–10 in Great Britain and Ireland
- January 1987 Southeast England snowfall

== Gallery ==
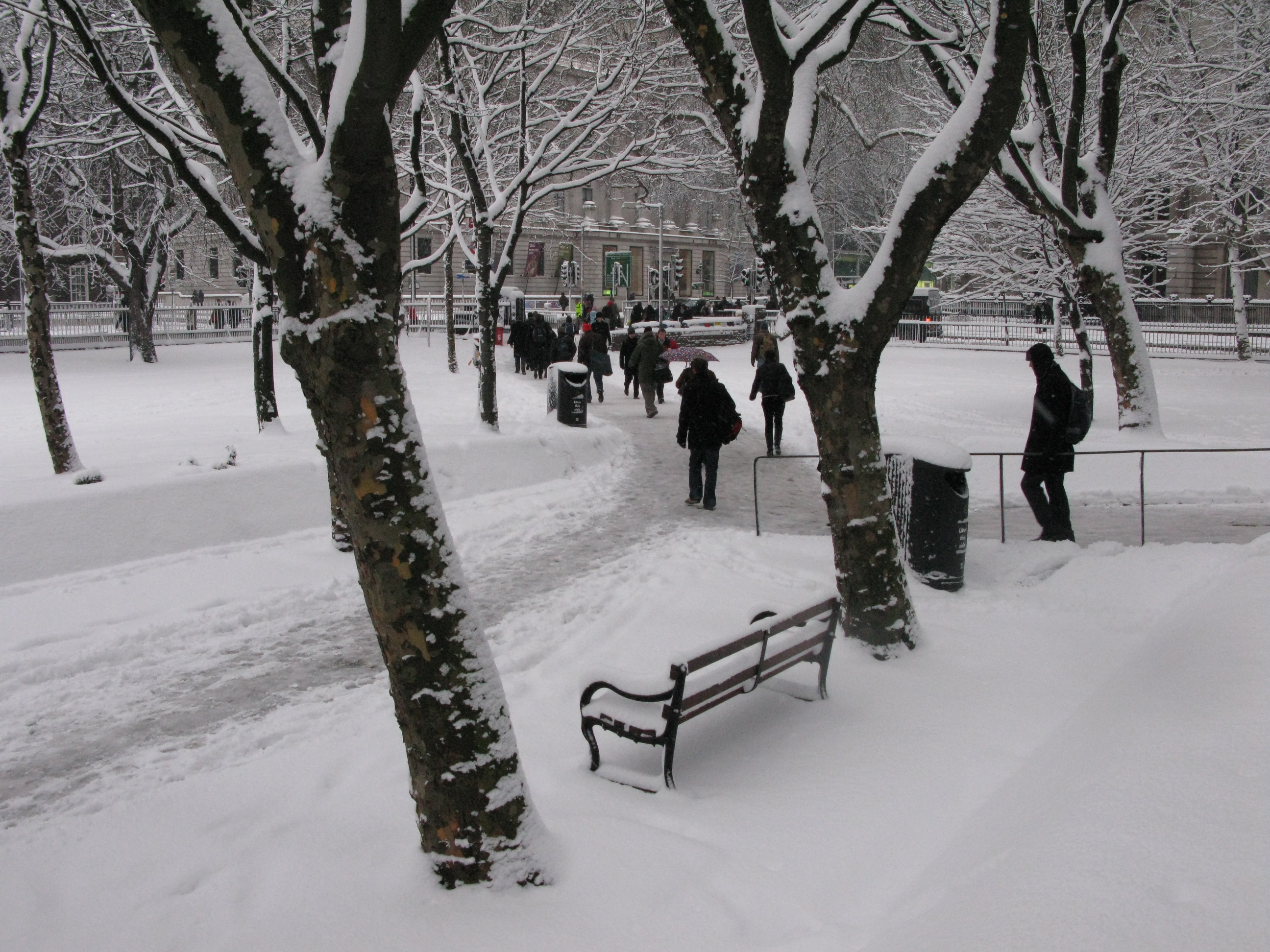
Commuters leaving Euston Station on 2 February

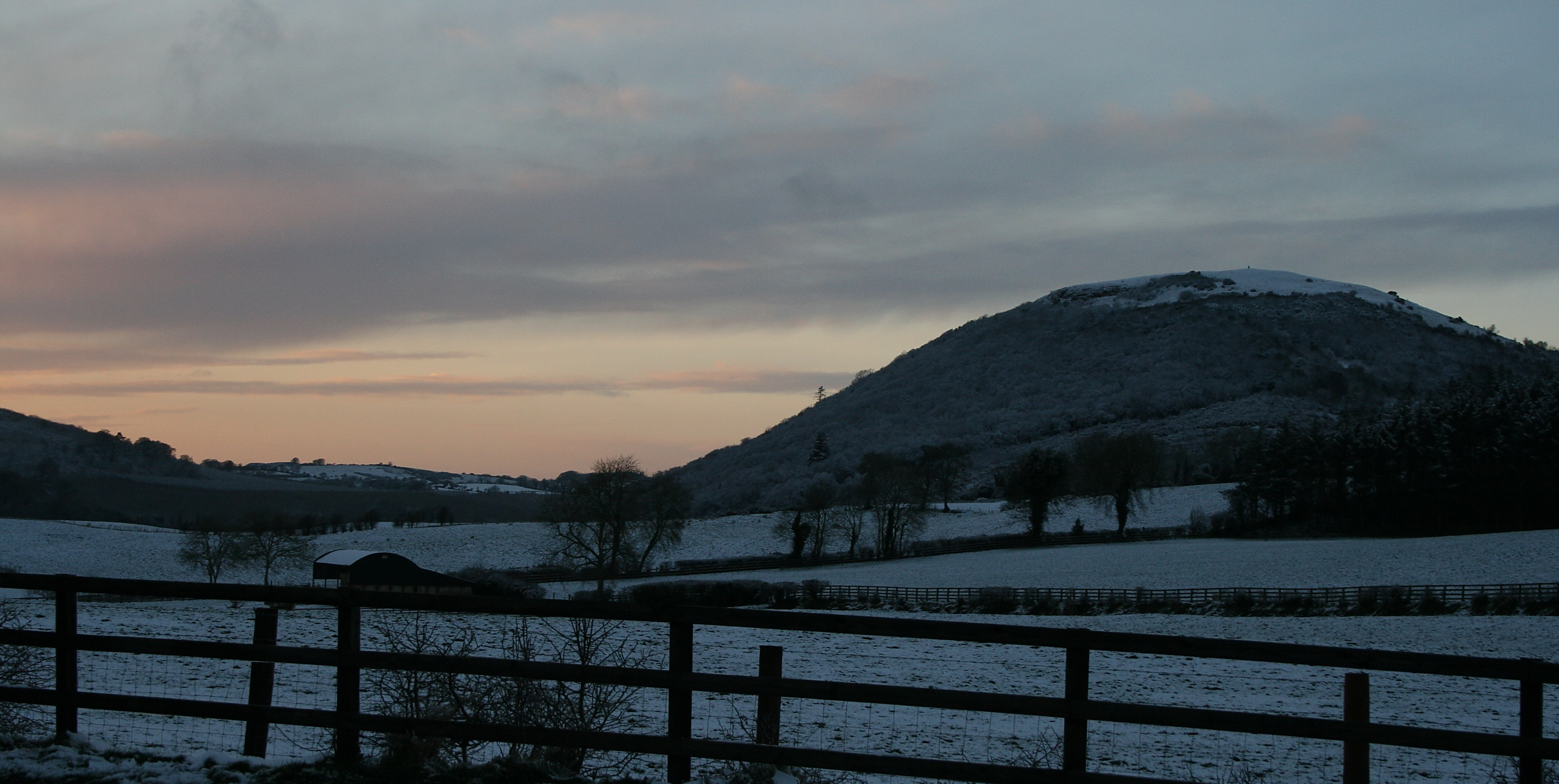
Snow in County Westmeath, 1 February 2009

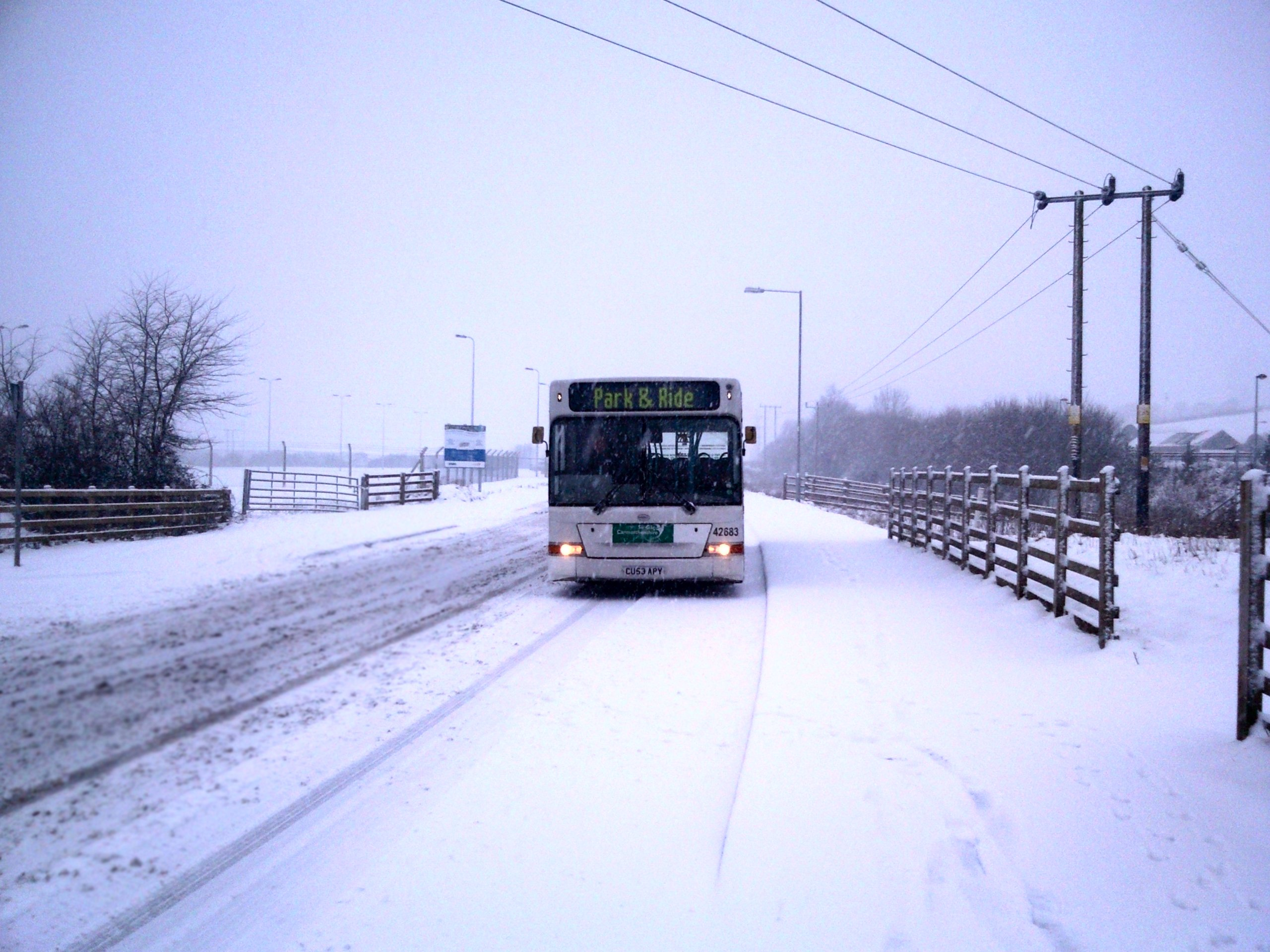
Park and Ride Bus near Carmarthen, Wales

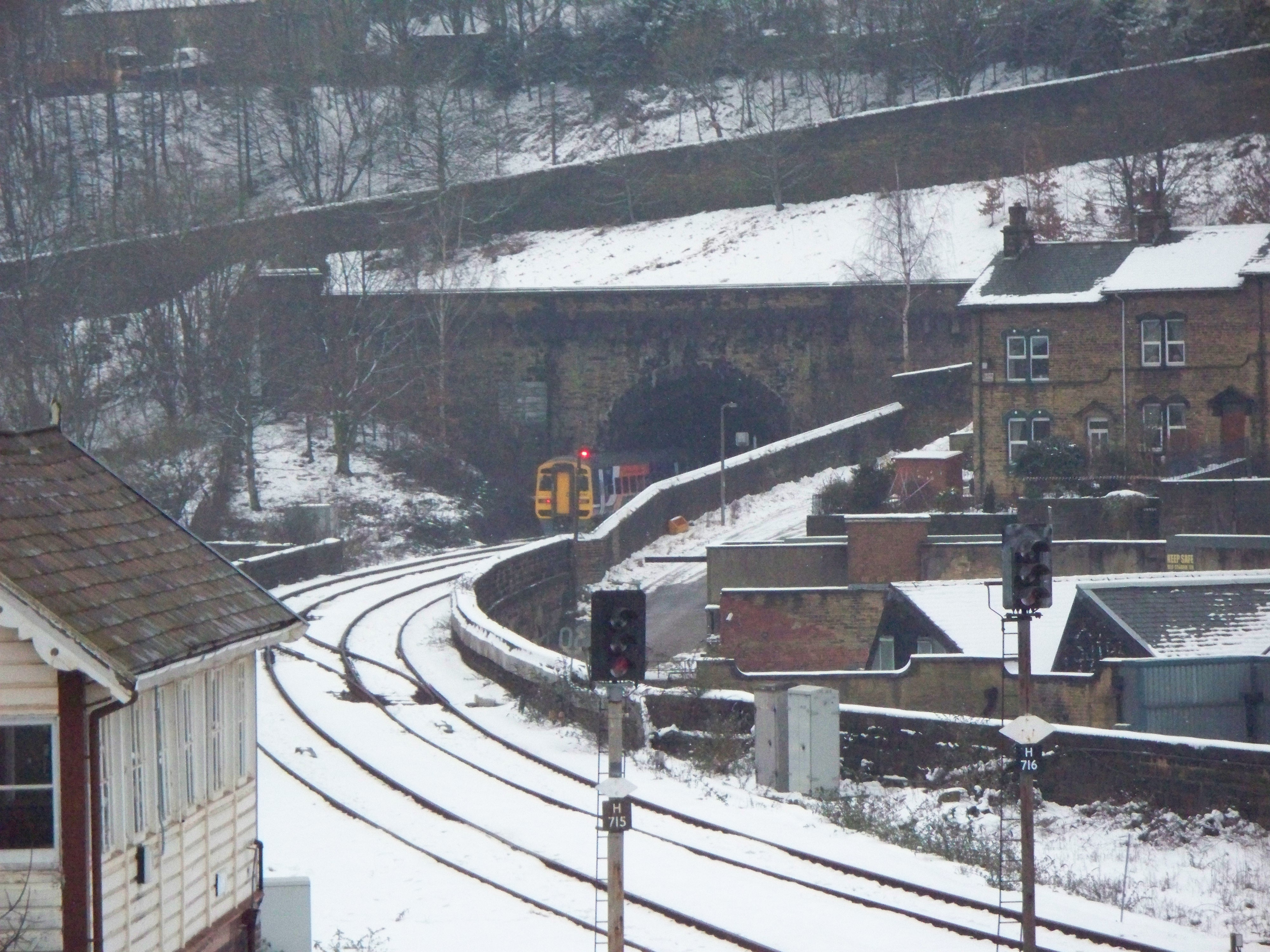
A Leeds-bound train leaving Halifax railway station on 5 February

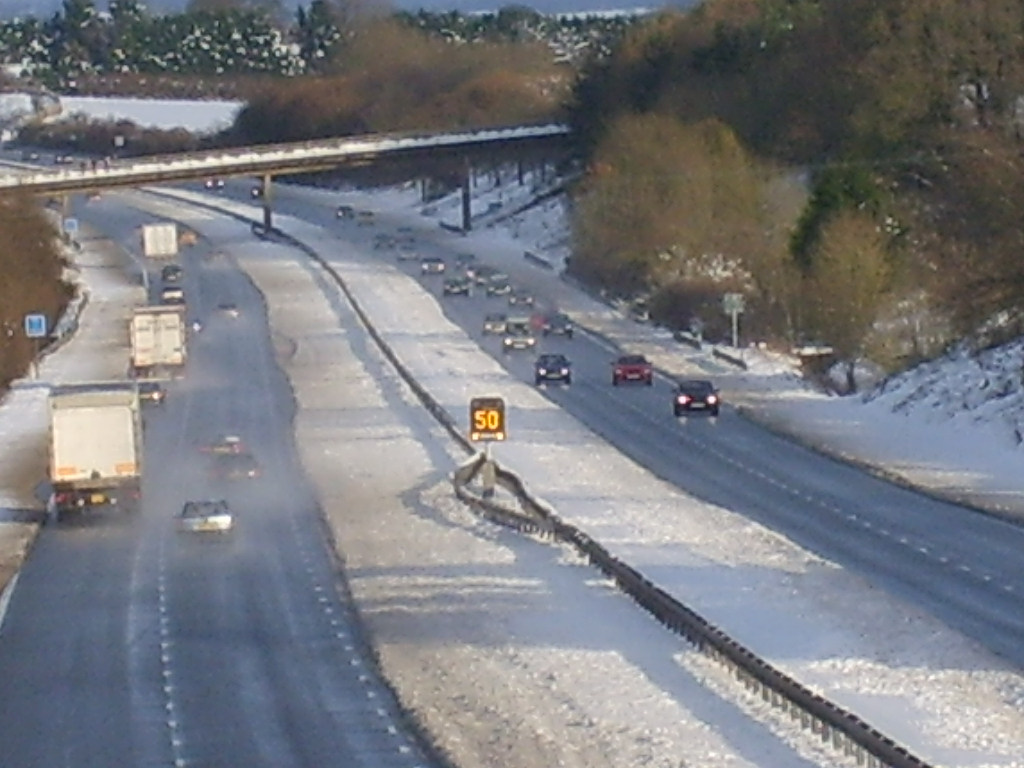
The M5 motorway near Wellington, Somerset on 6 February

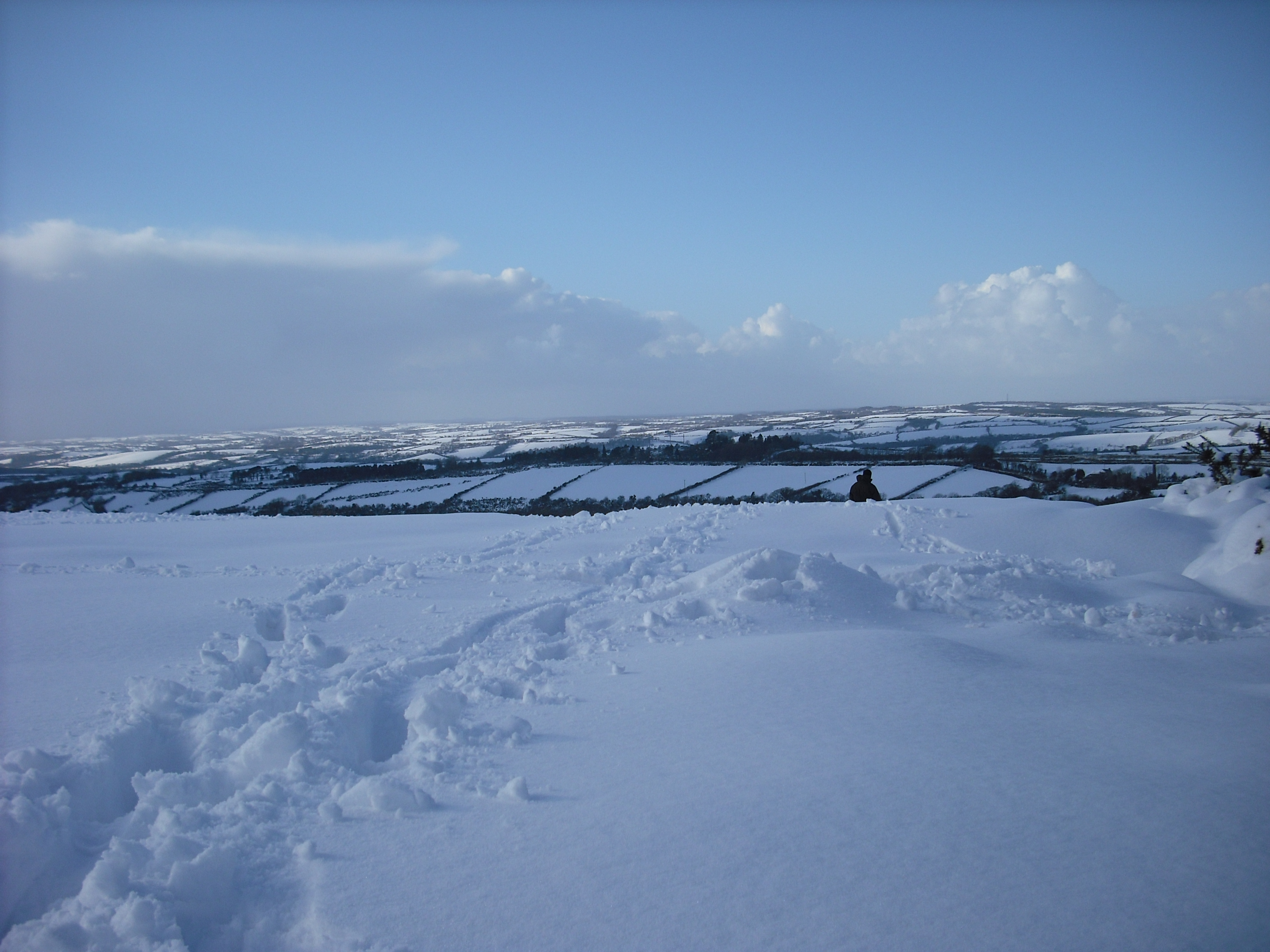
Near to Okehampton where the deepest snow fell

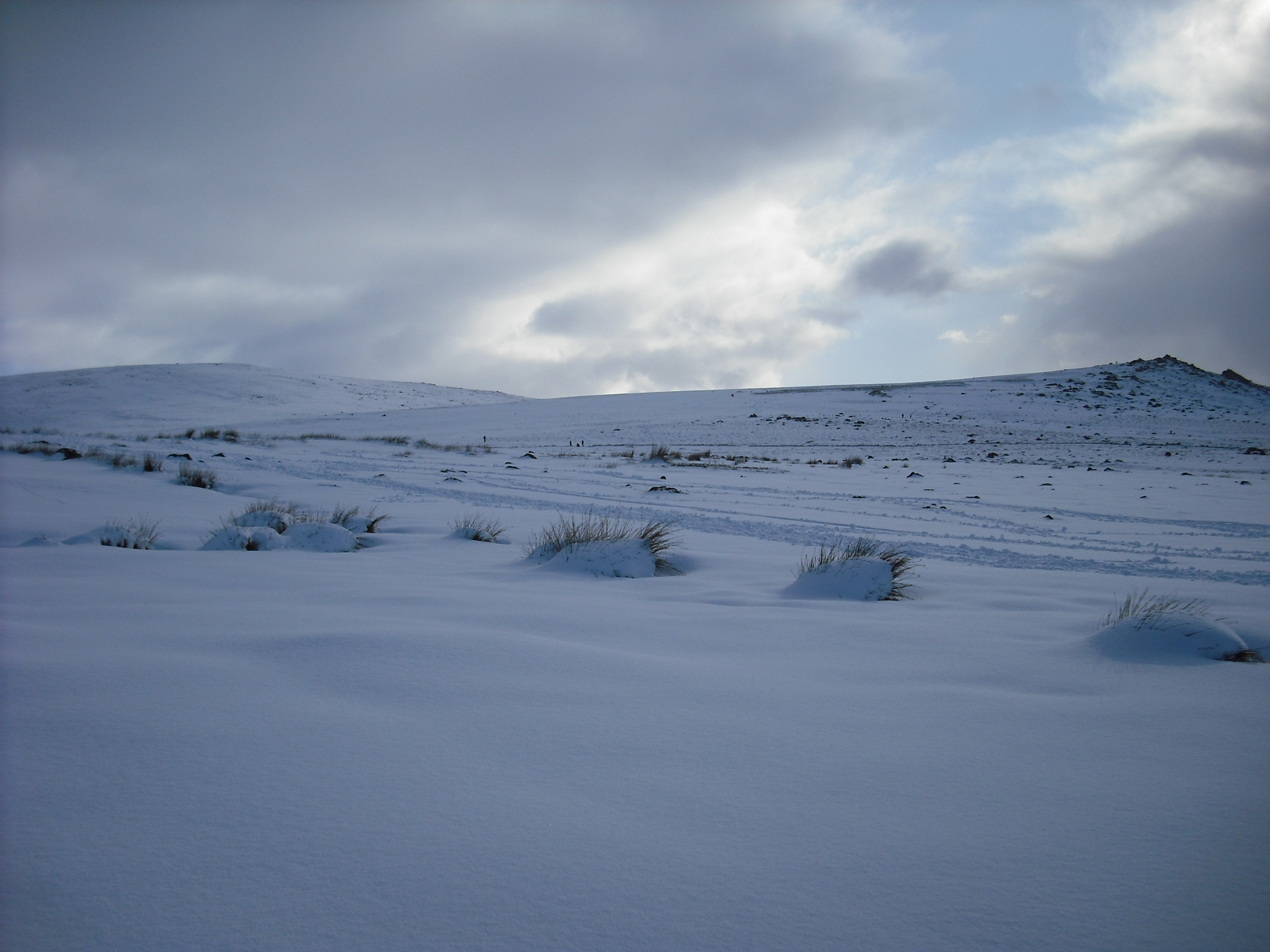
Dartmoor was blanketed with deep snow

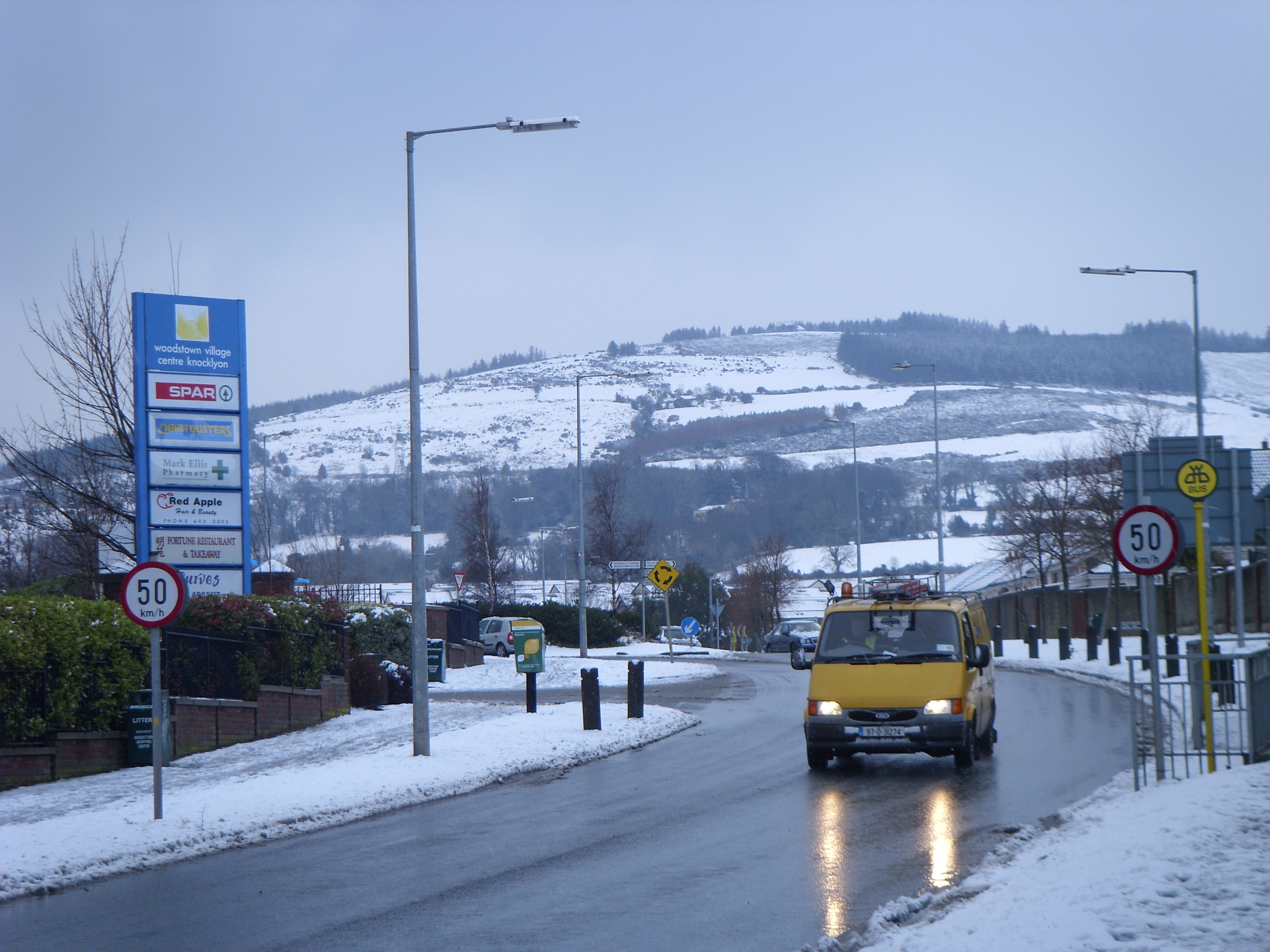
Ballycullen Road near Tallaght, County Dublin on 3 February

Picturesque snowdrift between Helmshore and Edgeworth, Lancashire in February 2009

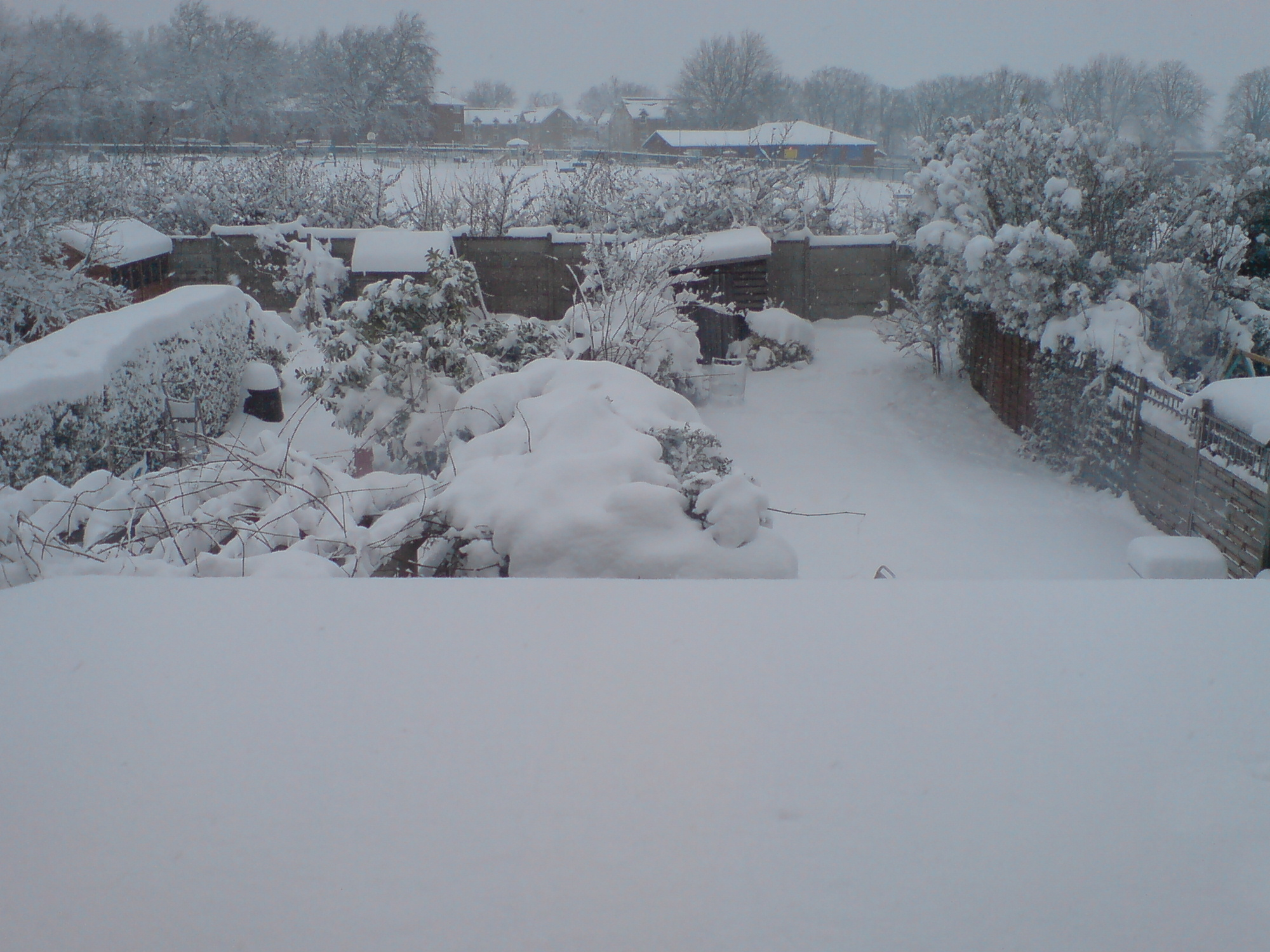
Snow in Epsom, Surrey
