= The wrong type of snow =

Byword for euphemistic and pointless excuses

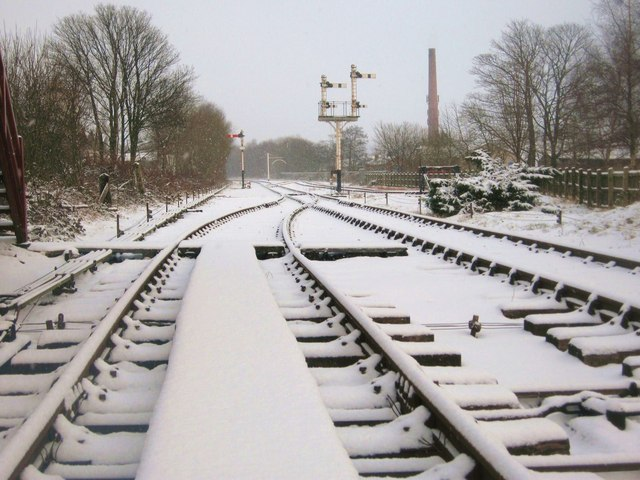
A layer of snow on railway tracks on the East Lancashire Railway

"The wrong type of snow" or "the wrong kind of snow" is a phrase coined by the British media in 1991 after severe weather caused disruption to many of British Rail's services. A British Rail press release stated that the disruptions were due to a particular type of snow on the line, and the media ridiculed this explanation and expressed scepticism that there were different types of snow. Henceforth in the United Kingdom, the phrase became a byword for euphemistic and pointless excuses.

== Background ==
The phrase originated in an interview conducted by James Naughtie on BBC Radio 4's Today Programme on 11 February 1991. British Rail's Director of Operations, Terry Worrall, was asked to comment on the adverse effects of the unusually heavy 1991 snowfall on railway services that winter. Worrall explained that "we are having particular problems with the type of snow, which is rare in the UK". Naughtie replied, "Oh, I see, it was the wrong kind of snow," to which Worrall replied, "No, it was a different kind of snow". The exchange prompted a headline in the London Evening Standard saying, "British Rail blames the wrong type of snow", which was swiftly taken up by the media and other papers.

The cold snap had been forecast and British Rail had claimed to be ready for the coming snow. However, the snow was unusually soft and powdery and too deep to be cleared by snowploughs – it needed snowblowers. The snow found its way into electrical systems and caused short circuits and traction motor damage in trains. For traction motors with integral cooling fans and air intakes pointing downwards – the type that is still common in British electric multiple units – the problem was made worse as the air intakes sucked up the loose snow. Meanwhile, the snow also became packed into sliding door mechanisms and points, causing them to fail. In addition, low temperatures resulted in problems with electric current collection from the third rail.

Many electric services had to be replaced by diesel haulage, and emergency timetables were introduced. Long delays were commonplace – up to eight hours in some cases. The disruption lasted over a week.

== Usage ==
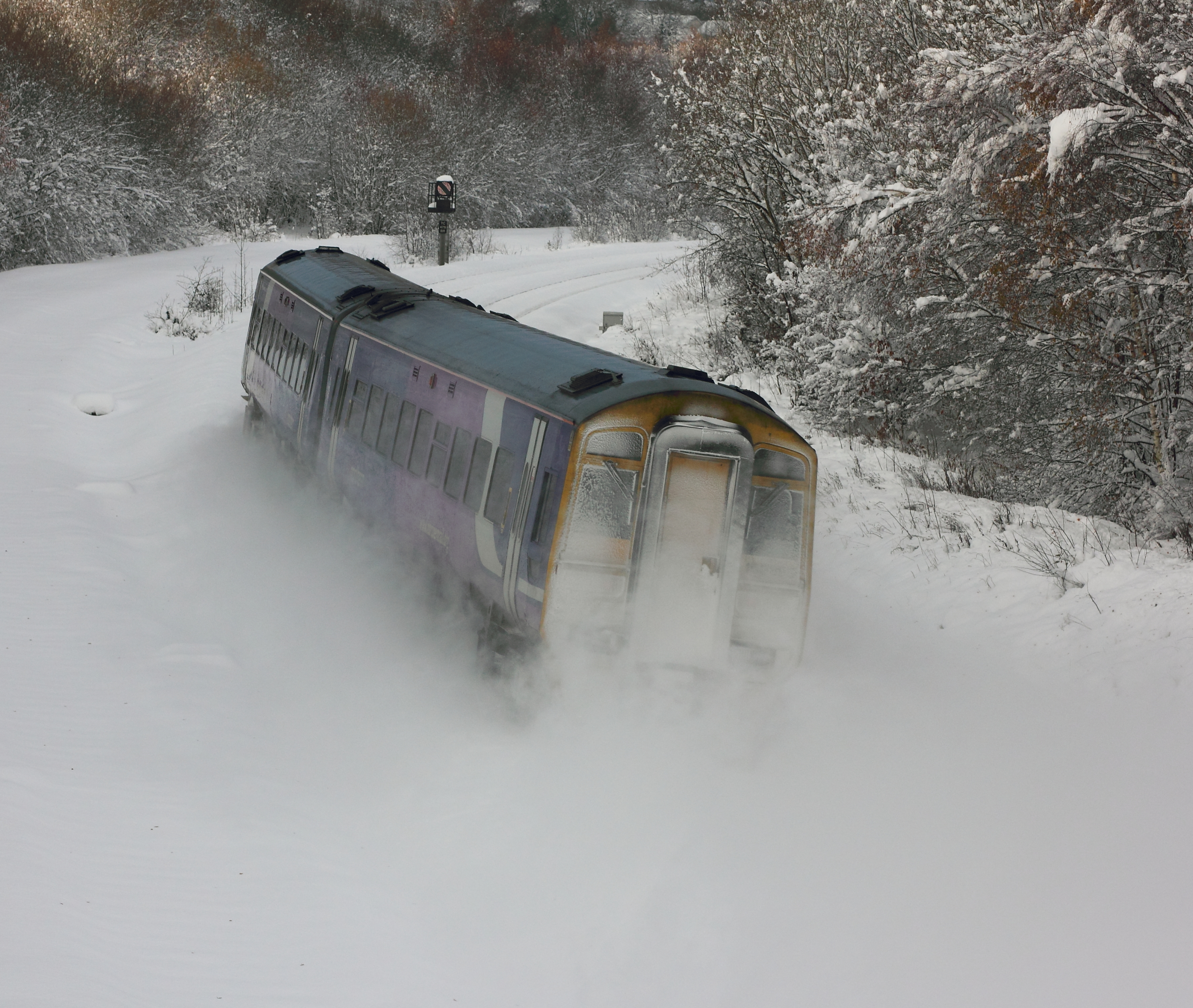
A train on the Erewash Valley Line in Derbyshire, England, during heavy snow in 2010

The phrase "the wrong type of snow", "the wrong kind of snow" and variants appear periodically in British media reports concerning railway incidents brought on by adverse weather, with an intended polemic effect of instilling disbelief in the reader. Since "the wrong type of snow" has entered British English phraseology, it has come to be regarded as an example of a snowclone, a type of reusable cliché with many variants.

During the December 2009 European snowfall, several Eurostar trains broke down in the Channel Tunnel, trapping 2,000 passengers in darkness; newspapers reported "wrong type of fluffy snow". Following the destruction of the coastal railway line at Dawlish, Devon during severe weather in 2014, the Daily Telegraph carried a cartoon by Matt with a notice reading "Trains cancelled – Wrong sort of seaweed". On 12 January 2016, The Guardian reported on Southeastern train delays caused by "strong sunlight" and the low winter sun with the headline "Wrong kind of sunlight delays Southeastern trains in London".

The emergence of the phrase "the wrong type of snow" came about during a period when the privatisation of British Rail was being widely debated in the media. Journalists frequently sourced anecdotal evidence to compose stories about failures in the performance of railway operators. Stock phrases involving "leaves on the line" and snow were used in headlines to ridicule seasonal disruption, to such an extent that they are now said to have passed into Britain's folklore and are considered to be established in the "collective British consciousness". The two have also been combined into "the wrong sort of leaves" in media coverage.

The popularity of the "wrong type of snow" phrase has been attributed to its expression of a national sense of disappointment with British infrastructure, along with a fading sense of national pride and romantic associations with railways. The phrase has been cited as an example of poor corporate communication and public relations. Its longevity and persistence in the public consciousness has been attributed to a highly effective but poorly chosen analogy that has "stuck" with its audience and is subject to interpretation in other contexts; what originated as a simplified explanation of a technical problem has become a popular code for a weak excuse. The "wrong kind of/type of" part of the phrase has itself been shown to exemplify semantic change, having undergone a process of grammaticalisation to move from an impartial description of weather conditions to become a politically loaded signifier of failure.

== Similar expressions ==
In Russian culture, the phrase "his grenades are of wrong system" ("гранаты не той системы") is used as an ironic comment on a petty excuse for something not done. It originated in a Soviet Ostern cult film, White Sun of the Desert (1970).

== See also ==
- Classifications of snow – Methods for describing snowfall events and the resulting snow crystals
- Eskimo words for snow – Linguistic cliché
- Pennsylvania Railroad GG1 Locomotive – February 1958 Blizzard's fine snow

== Sources ==
- Allan, Ian. Motive Power Monthly (May 1991) ISSN 0952-2867
- Hartley, Peter; Bruckmann, Clive G. (2002). Business Communication. Routledge. ISBN 0-415-19550-0.
- Gourvish, Terence (2002). British Rail, 1974–97: From Integration to Privatisation. OUP Oxford. ISBN 0-19-926909-2.
