= Winter of 1990–91 in Western Europe =

Winter of 1990–1991 in Western Europe
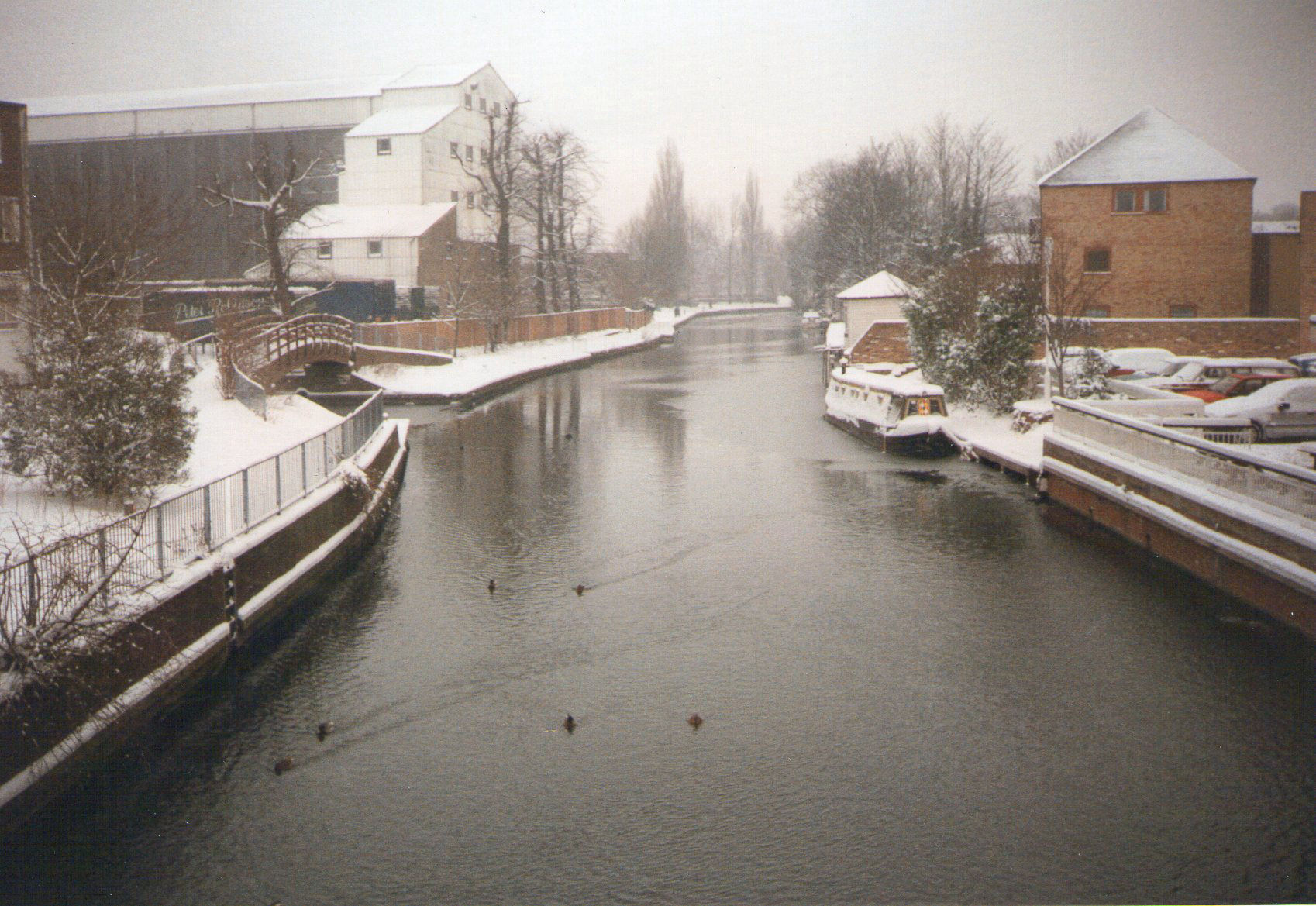
- Snow in Ware, Hertfordshire, February 1991
- First event started: December 1990
- Last event concluded: February 1991

Seasonal statistics
- Total fatalities: At least 42
- Total damage: Unknown

The winter of 1990–91 was a particularly cold winter in Western Europe, noted especially for its effect on the United Kingdom, and for two significantly heavy falls of snow which occurred in December 1990 and February 1991. Sandwiched in between was a period of high winds and heavy rain which caused widespread damage. The winter was the coldest since January 1987, and the snowfall experienced in many parts of the United Kingdom would not be seen again until the snowfall of February 2009.

== December 1990 ==
The snowfall of early December 1990 was particularly disruptive to large parts of the United Kingdom, although heavy snow was also reported across much of Western Europe.

In the United Kingdom snow began to fall over the Midlands, Wales and the Pennines on the night of 7–8 December 1990 and continued for much of the following day. The rate of snowfall was quite heavy, around 6 centimetres (2.4 in) an hour, and as a result many areas were covered within half an hour of the snow starting to fall. Coupled with this were high winds which reached gale force in many areas leading to blizzard conditions. Many parts of the Midlands reported at least 20 centimetres (7.9 in) of snow while depths reached 60 centimetres (24 in) in the Derby area. On the Welsh Mountains there were drifts of up to 4 metres (13 ft). Snow fell in Western Europe the following day, 9 December.

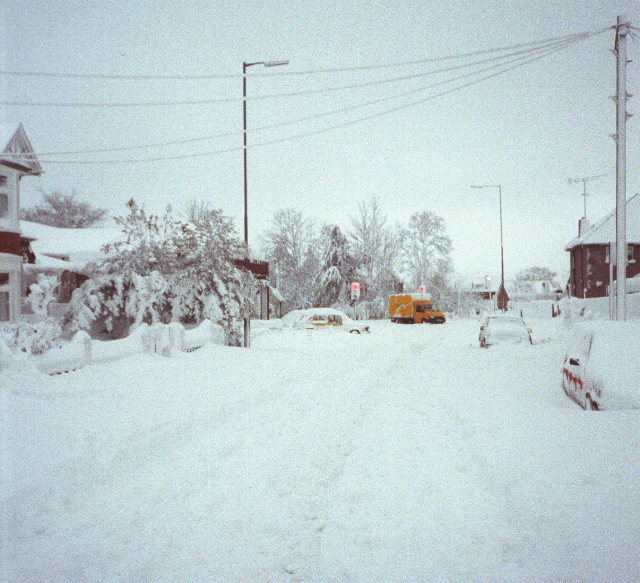
Snow in Canley, Coventry on 8 December 1990.

Transport was severely disrupted with many people trapped in their cars and all rail services in the Midlands cancelled, while elsewhere in western Europe, roads and airports were closed. In northern Spain, traffic officials were forced to shut mountain passes due to heavy snow while rail services in Tessin, southern Switzerland were also severely disrupted. The state's Lugano Airport was also closed. In France, the main highway between Lyon and Grenoble was blocked and traffic had to be rerouted, while the Mont Blanc tunnel linking France and Italy through the Alps was also inaccessible. Many roads in parts of Austria's East Tyrol and western Carinthia were closed due to avalanche fears. Snow also fell in Italy where Turin saw its first pre-Christmas snow since 1964. At the same time much of southern Europe experienced high winds and heavy rain, with ferry services suspended in Venice following floods.

The harsh weather conditions brought down power lines across England leading to loss of electricity for many areas. Power was also disrupted in parts of France. In the UK some 650,000 people were without power, and about 1.2 million without water supplies for several days. The Army was called in to help restore utility supplies to outlying areas. In addition, the adverse weather conditions had a negative economic impact with takings at stores on what was the third Saturday before Christmas considerably lower than normal.

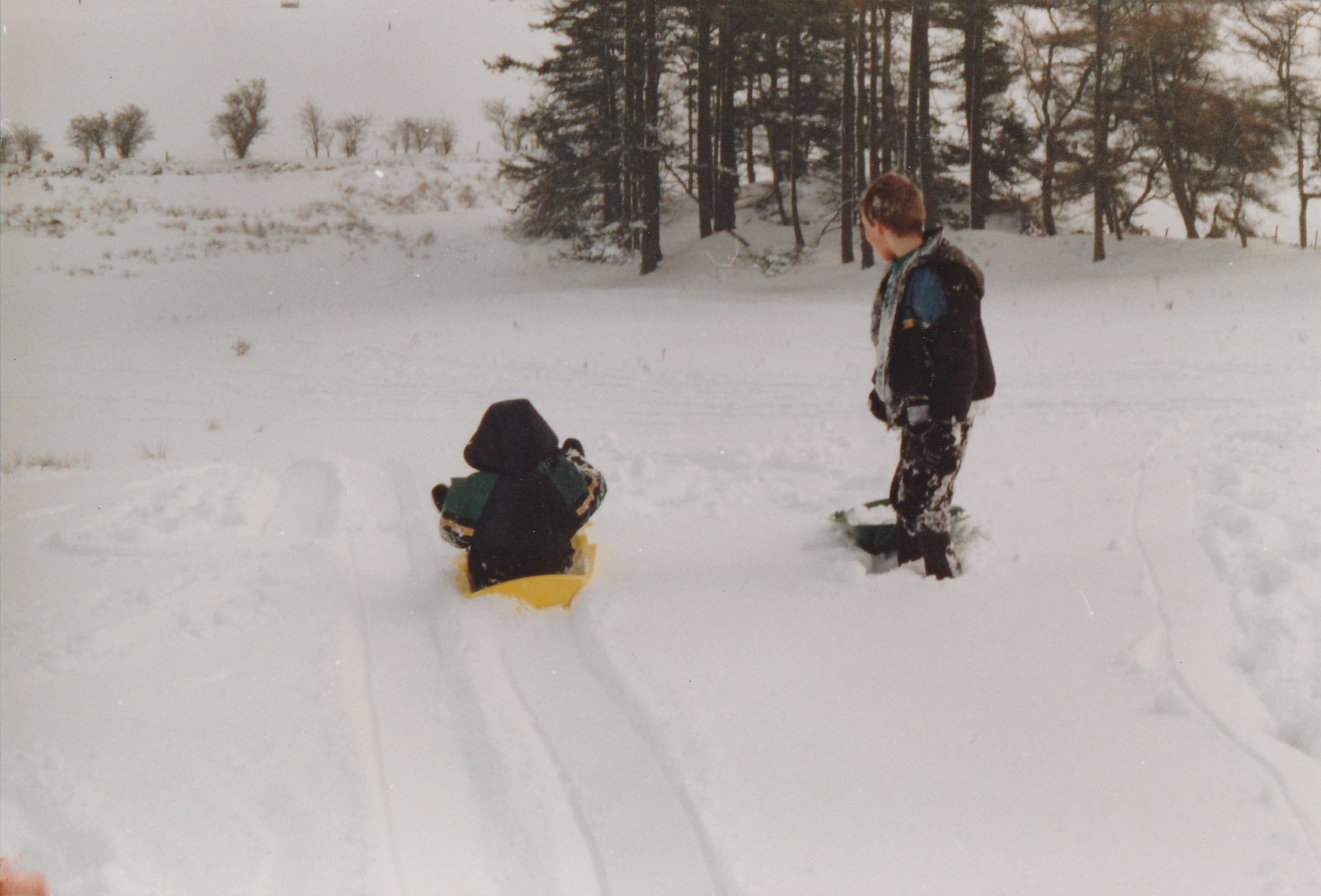
Children tobogganing in Manor Kilbride, Co Wicklow, Ireland in winter 1990

The severe weather led to the deaths of ten people in the UK. Three were killed in road accidents in Northern Ireland which was hit by gale-force winds. In Austria, a 21 car pile up was caused by ice on the Inntal highway injuring several people.

Most of the snow had gone within four days, but its effects were felt for several days afterward. Much of the rest of December was unsettled, and the UK was hit by heavy storms over the Christmas and New Year period. High winds and heavy rain on Christmas Day caused disruption and power cuts for some parts of the UK, while the UK and Ireland experienced severe gales on 5 and 6 January 1991. Gusts of up to 70 mph (110 km/h) brought down trees and power lines leaving thousands of homes blacked out across Ireland and the southwest of England, resulting in the deaths of 30 people. The dead included 11 crew members who were lost off two merchant vessels, a couple out walking on the beach near Brighton and 13 people who died in Ireland as a result of falling trees and other accidents. Seven of the Irish deaths occurred when a tree crashed onto a minibus.

== February 1991 ==
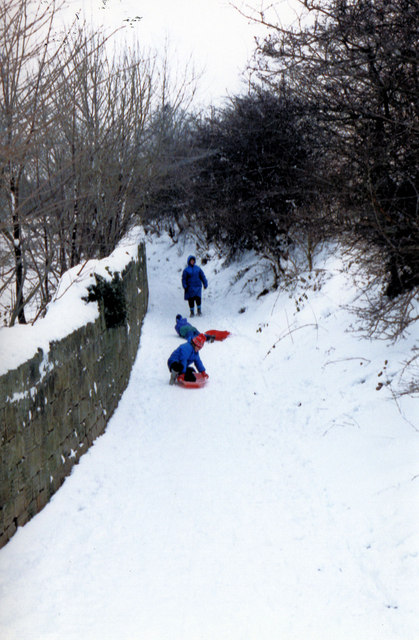
People sledging in Darfield, South Yorkshire, in February 1991.

The second snow event of the winter occurred in early February 1991 and brought the coldest weather since January 1987. Unlike the previous storm it hit much of Europe, freezing rivers and lakes, and even the canals of Venice which froze over for the first time since 1985. In France the French Riviera experienced its heaviest snowfall for five years leading to traffic chaos – many drivers were stranded on the coastal road between Nice and Antibes, while elsewhere two people were killed after becoming exposed to the cold weather, and horse racing at the Mediterranean resort of Cagnes-sur-Mer was cancelled due to snowfall. The southern Soviet Union which usually experienced fairly mild winters saw temperatures fall to −10 °C (14 °F), while Spitsbergen in Norway enjoyed unseasonably mild weather.

In the United Kingdom the snow was brought in by a cold easterly wind. At first it was mostly concentrated in the eastern counties of England, although it quickly spread inland. By the evening of 6 February many parts of England and Wales were experiencing snow showers, and by the following morning many areas woke to a covering of powdery snow. Along with this came a severe frost coupled with sub-zero temperatures, and heavy snowfalls which continued to fall throughout the day. Temperatures were as low as −11.7 °C (10.9 °F) and did not exceed −5 °C (23 °F) in many areas. Snow depths were in excess of 10 centimetres (3.9 in) across England and drifted in the easterly wind. On higher ground levels reached 30 centimetres (12 in). Villages on Exmoor were cut off by drifts approaching 2 metres (6 ft 7 in).

Once again the snow brought travel chaos to much of the country, particularly to the railways, with British Rail making its now infamous excuse that severe delays to services were being caused by the wrong type of snow. Heathrow Airport was forced to cancel flights, while Birmingham and Gatwick were closed. Cars were abandoned as roads and motorways became impassable, and canals, ponds and even part of the Bristol Channel froze over.

By 8 February conditions had deteriorated further, with depths of snow approaching 20 centimetres (7.9 in) in many areas. Parts of Yorkshire recording 51 centimetres (20 in). Bingley in West Yorkshire had 47 centimetres (19 in) and Pencelli in Powys 35 centimetres (14 in). After temperatures dropped to −10 °C (14 °F) on the night of 8–9 February, conditions eased slightly the following day and continued to do so on 10 February. However, night-time temperatures remained low, and there was a fresh snowfall on 12 February. After this high pressure began to move across the UK and despite further night time frosts a slow thaw began. On 20 February an Atlantic system arrived bringing mild south westerly winds and rain which escalated the thaw and allowed temperatures to return to double figures.

== See also ==
- Winter of 1946–47 in the United Kingdom
- Winter of 1962–1963 in the United Kingdom
- February 2009 British Isles snowfall
- Winter of 2009–10 in Europe
- Weather of 2009
