= Winter of 2009–10 in Europe =

Winter of 2009–2010 in Europe
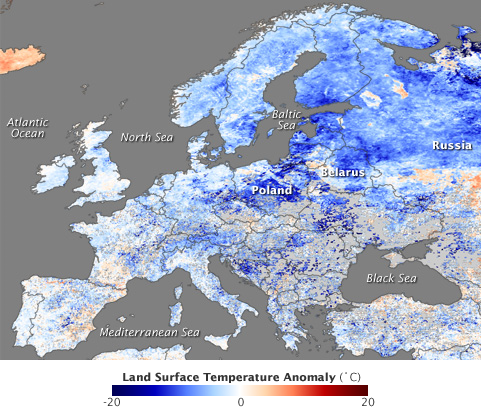
- Map of Europe showing the difference of temperature between 11–18 December 2009 and the 2000–2008 average.
- First event started: 16 December 2009
- Last event concluded: 1 April 2010

Seasonal statistics
- Maximum snowfall accumulation: 115 centimetres (45 in) on 25 February in Kvam Municipality, Norway
- Total fatalities: > 310
- Total damage: Unknown

Related articles
- Winter of 2009–10 in Great Britain and Ireland

The winter of 2009–2010 in Europe was unusually cold. Globally, unusual weather patterns brought cold, moist air from the north. Weather systems were undergoing cyclogenesis from North American storms moving across the Atlantic Ocean to the west, and saw many parts of Europe experiencing heavy snowfall and record-low temperatures. This led to a number of deaths, widespread transport disruption, power failures and postponed sporting events.

== Cause ==
The cold weather was caused by high pressure over Greenland and Iceland forcing weather patterns southward, a phenomenon described by meteorologists as the Arctic oscillation and also the North Atlantic oscillation which were negative compared to normal. The North Atlantic oscillation in Winter 2009/10 was lower than during any winter in over a century and this resulted in more easterly winds bringing cold air into Northern Europe from Siberia and the Arctic. Scientists have shown that El Niño, the quasi-biennial oscillation and solar variability all conspired to drive this extreme winter.

== December 2009 ==
=== 16–21 December ===
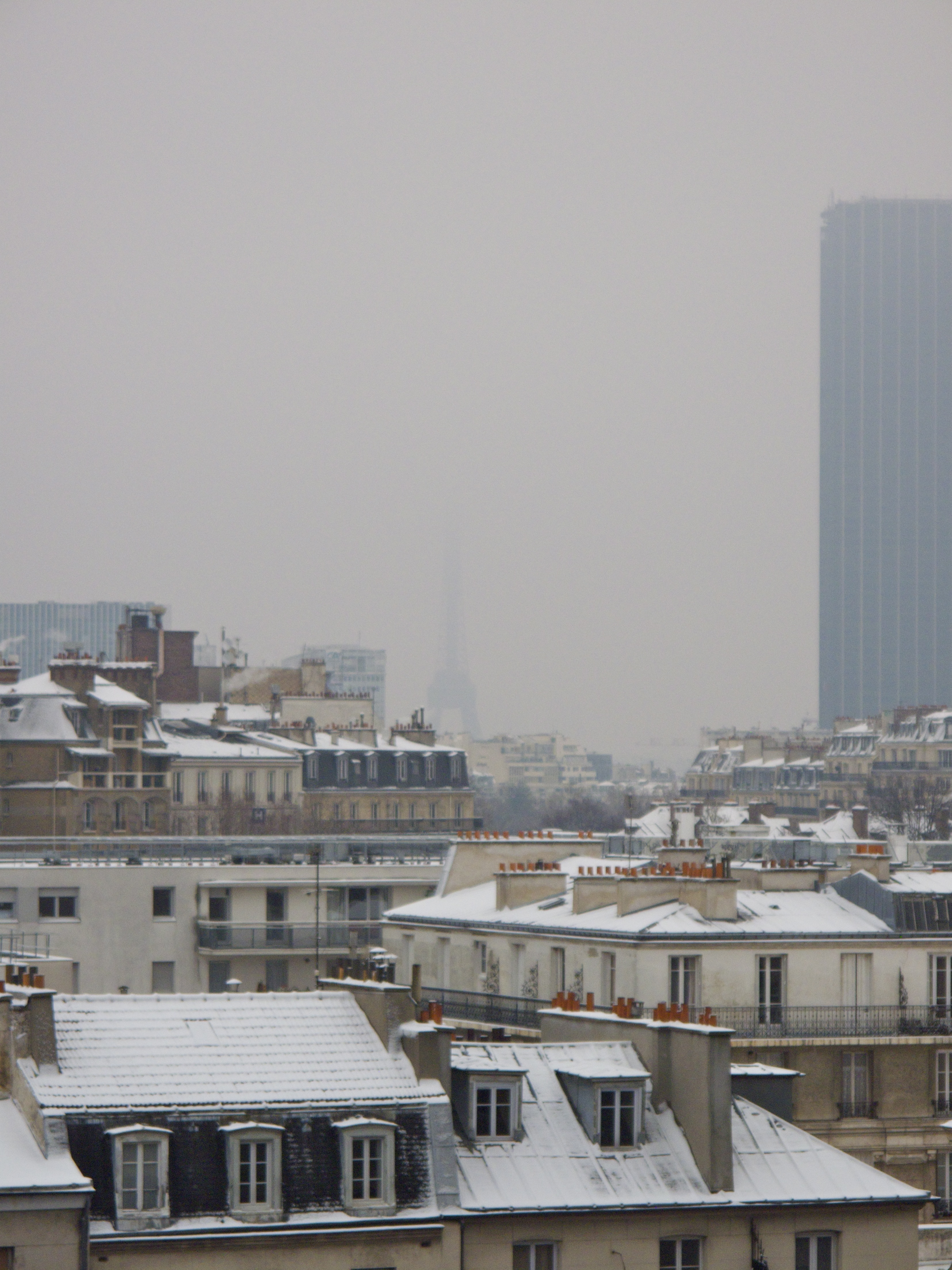
Paris, 17 December 2009

Light snowfall occurred in the UK on 16 December and weather warnings were given on most local TV stations; there were some traffic jams towards the south. The snow later spread towards France and northern Spain. In mainland Europe, early snowfall was seen across much of the western half of the continent. On 17 December, the Swiss canton of Grisons saw a record-low overnight temperature of −32 °C (−25.6 °F). This snowfall led to the shutdown of Utrecht Centraal (the largest rail hub in the Netherlands). While snowfall on highways led to the busiest morning rush hour of 2009, with a total of 671 km (417 m) in traffic jams. The following day, heavy overnight snowfall caused widespread disruption across large parts of the South East, East Anglia, the East Midlands and Yorkshire and the Humber in Britain. This snow was in the north half of a depression with east winds centred south of England. Several deaths attributed to the cold weather were reported.

During the night of 18–19 December, five Eurostar trains were stuck in the Channel Tunnel, trapping more than 2,000 people for up to 16 hours after the vehicles suffered electrical failures because of freezing overnight temperatures. Passengers were without heating, lighting and air-conditioning for several hours while food and water ran out. Some passengers were evacuated via service tunnels to car trains, while others were kept on their trains until the trains could be towed out. Eurostar added special services on the evening of 19 December to transport "vulnerable passengers" between London, Paris and Brussels. However, a service from Paris became the sixth train to break down after becoming stuck near Ebbsfleet, Kent. The cause of the breakdowns was unclear; Eurostar initially blamed the sudden contrast between freezing temperatures above ground and the 25 °C (77 °F) heat of the tunnel, which affected the high-speed engines.

On 19 December, a daily high temperature of -11.5 °C (11.3 °F) was recorded in Mainz, Germany, making it remaining in the two digit negatives all day for the first time since 1956. On the 20th, the December record low of -16.5 °C (2.3 °F) was set with great distance (previously -13.9 °C), and also overall the lowest temperature measured since 1979

On 20 December in the Netherlands, the Royal Dutch Meteorological Institute (KNMI) issued an official weather alarm for the entire country following heavy snowfall (15–20 cm or 5.9–7.9 in) in the west, which eventually spread to the entire country. In most cities bus services were halted and tram service was halted in all four major cities. In northern Italy several locations recorded the lowest temperatures since 1985, with one low reaching −17 °C (1.4 °F).

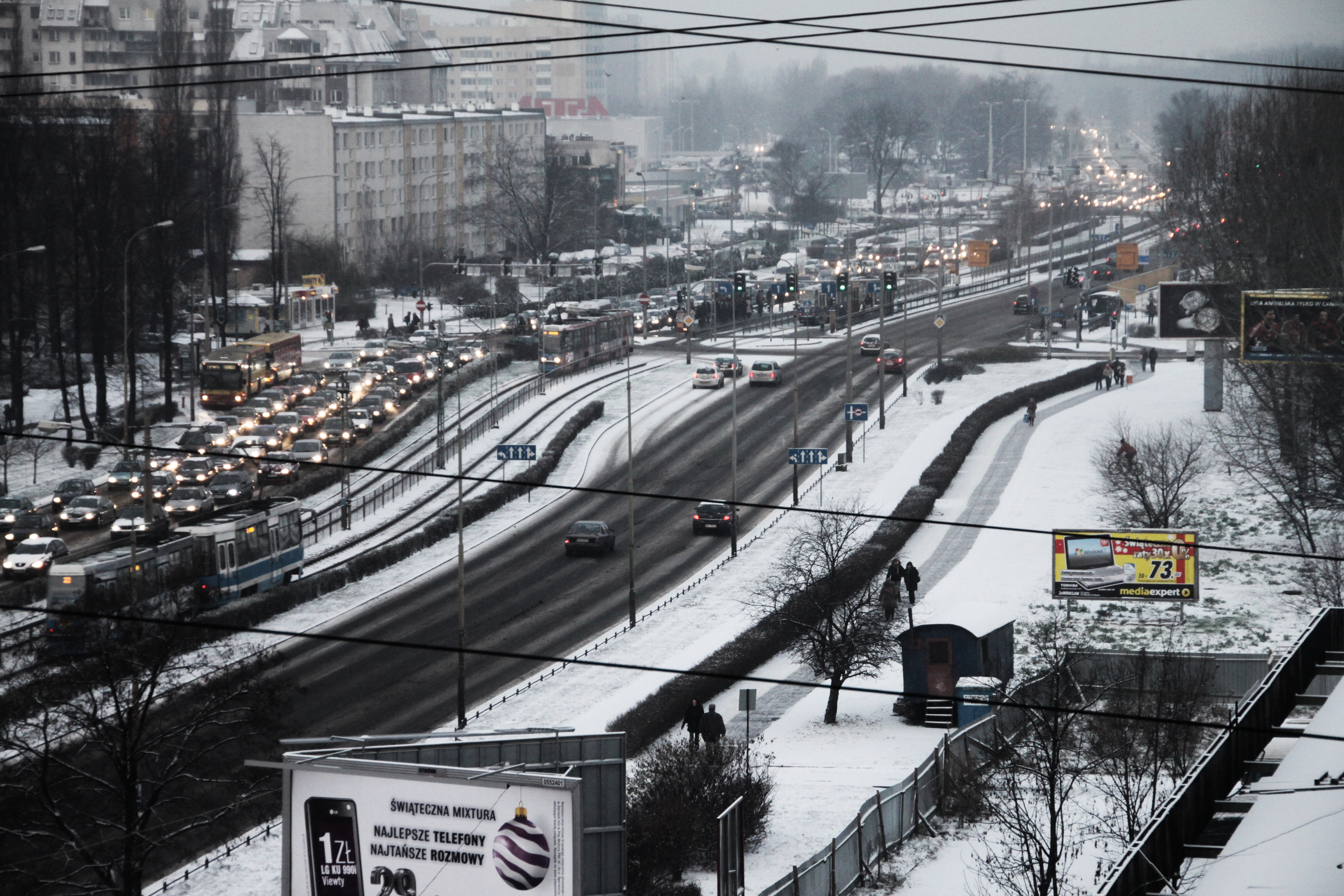
Wrocław, Poland, 20 December 2009

Police in Poland reported that 15 people froze to death in the country as overnight temperatures fell as low as −20 °C (−4 °F) and 47 people died indirectly as a result of the cold during the month of December. Public appeals were made to the Polish community to report any homeless or drunk people lying outdoors, in an attempt to reduce the number of deaths from exposure to the cold.

In Kosovo, one person died and ten people were injured in traffic accidents because of poor weather conditions. Kosovo Police spokesperson, Arbër Beka, said that one person died in an accident which occurred near Đakovica; there were injuries reported in 16 traffic accidents, and a total of 74 accidents causing property damage. The local police called on residents to be careful on the roads because of the heavy snowfall and very difficult driving conditions.

On 21 December, the M25 motorway and large parts of the M3, M4, M40, M1 and M11 motorways in the United Kingdom were brought to a standstill until late at night and many towns were gridlocked. About 100 people were able to travel from London Victoria Station to Ashford International railway station on a steam train hauled by the locomotive Tornado. Widespread transport disruption affected parts of England, Wales, Scotland and Ireland (except a few southern parts of Munster).

In Bosnia and Herzegovina, three people were found dead from hypothermia in Sarajevo and Teslić.

=== 22–26 December ===
Fresh overnight snowfall brought renewed problems to parts of the United Kingdom. Particularly badly hit were north Hampshire and the Thames Valley in England. In Basingstoke, some 3,000 motorists were forced to either abandon their vehicles or sleep in them overnight after becoming stuck in gridlocked traffic; approximately 2,000 cars were abandoned. The vehicle recovery service, AA, accused some local authorities of not acting quickly enough to grit the roads, claiming some "key roads" had "not been gritted at all". The Local Government Association dismissed the claims as "unverified, unsubstantiated and unjustified". A man found unconscious in his back garden on the Isle of Lewis, in the Outer Hebrides, after a night out over the weekend died. A homeless charity in France reported that 12 people died during December as a result of the severe cold.

On 23 December, overnight temperatures in the UK once again dropped well below freezing. Dalwhinnie in the central Highlands of Scotland recorded a low of −16 °C (3 °F) and Edinburgh recorded −10 °C (14 °F), causing Scottish Transport Minister Stewart Stevenson to state that conditions on Scottish roads were at their worst in 20 years. Air travel was disrupted in the United Kingdom, with Southampton Airport cancelling (or diverting) all inbound and outbound flights until midday due to a frozen runway. Train services were cancelled for most of the day from Southampton Airport Parkway. A Ryanair flight landing at Prestwick Airport overshot the runway; no injuries were reported and the airport was soon reopened. Two women were killed and more than 40 people injured following a coach crash on an ungritted country road in Cornwall, as a party returned from a trip to see Christmas lights in Mousehole the previous evening. Weather forecasters warned of icy conditions and further snowfall into Christmas Eve, particularly affecting northern England and the East Midlands.

In western Serbia, rapidly melting snow caused the Jadar River in Loznica to flood and resulted in farmland being submerged. Danijela Despotović, of the Hydro-Meteorological Service of Serbia in Loznica, said that the temperature was −19 °C (−2 °F) in the town. Heavy snowfall began in Saint Petersburg, Russia. By 26 December the city was under 35 cm of snow, creating the largest December snowfall recorded in the city since 1881.

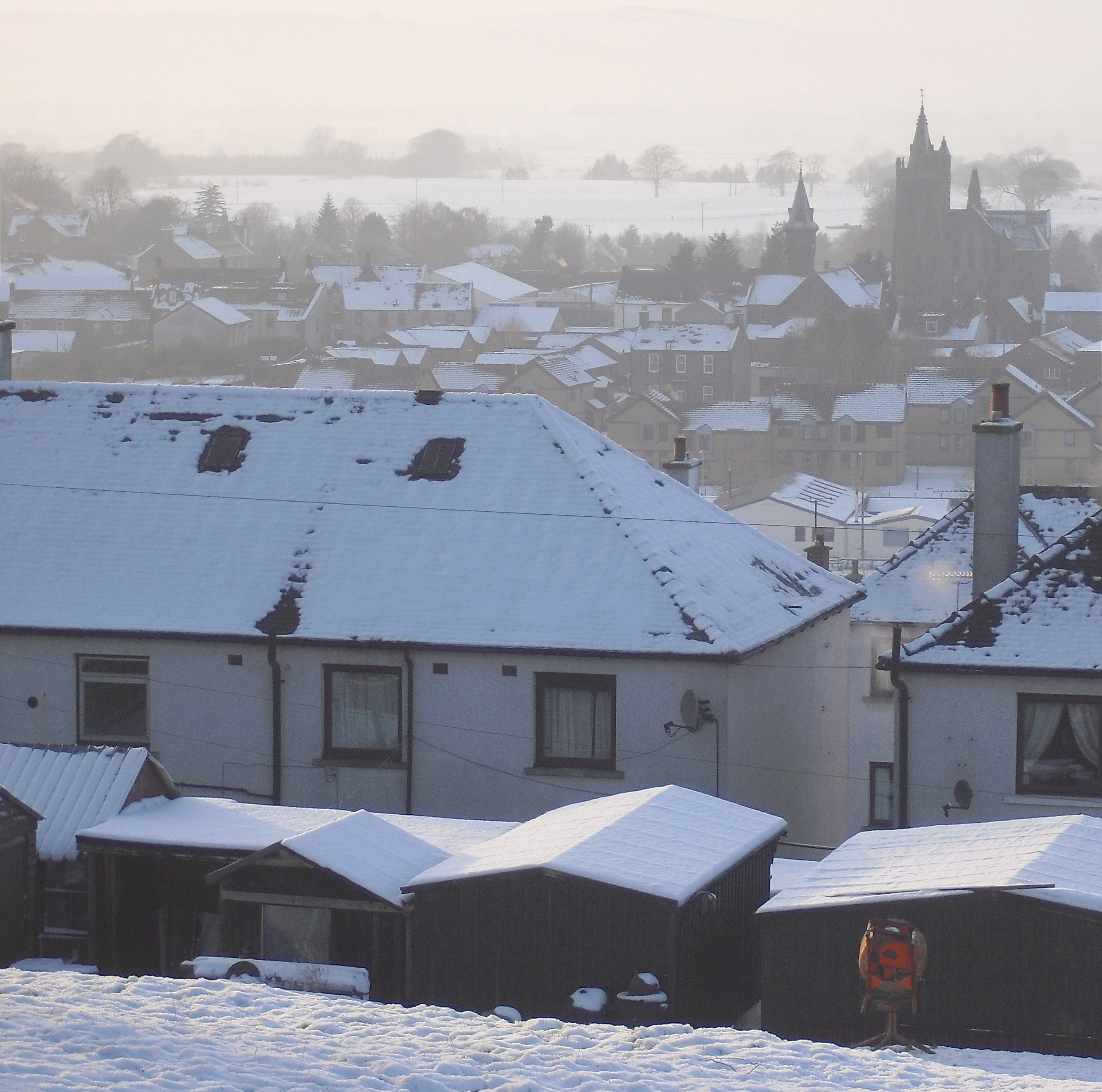
Lockerbie, Scotland, 25 December 2009

On Christmas Day, parts of Britain had a White Christmas for the first time since 2004 after snow fell in northern and central Scotland and parts of England (including Nottinghamshire). The Netherlands had its first white Christmas since 1981.

On 26 December (Boxing Day), drivers in Northern Ireland were warned of icy conditions. Conditions in many other parts of the UK continued to improve as milder air moved in from the south. However, northern England and Scotland remained cold and nighttime temperatures continued to drop below freezing. Some Boxing Day sporting fixtures were cancelled (or postponed) because of continuing icy conditions in certain areas, including the National Hunt meeting at Towcester and all but two of the Scottish Football League's matches. Some parts of East Anglia suffered electricity cuts, including Dedham, Stratford St Mary and parts of Colchester; in more remote parts of the region, some were without power for 36 hours.

=== 27–31 December ===
Parts of England again suffered power cuts on 26–27 December. Scotland experienced fresh snowfall overnight; Perthshire being the most-affected area, where between 12 and 18 inches (30–46 cm) fell. Temperatures fell to −16 °C (3 °F) in Tyndrum overnight on 27–28 December, and to −14 °C (7 °F) at Tulloch Bridge in the Highlands. The Met Office issued fresh severe weather warnings and motorists were advised to drive with caution. The A75 between Stranraer and Newton Stewart was closed due to icy conditions; while the southbound carriageway of the A9 was blocked between the A824 and B8081 in Perth and Kinross following an accident at Gleneagles.

Temperatures dropped to −18 °C (0 °F) in parts of the Highlands overnight on 28–29 December, with Braemar recording Britain's lowest temperature of the Winter. Fresh travel warnings were issued on 29 December, as wintry conditions continued to cause problems on Scotland's roads. The runway of Inverness Airport was briefly closed because of snow and ice, and First ScotRail reduced its service to and from Glasgow Central because of the severe conditions. However, the snow and icy conditions were good for the Scottish ski industry, which said the weather helped it to experience its best start to the season for several years. Warnings of heavy snow were issued for Wales, the Midlands, Yorkshire and Humber, north-west England, eastern and southern England. More snow began falling across parts of Wales/central and northern England on the evening of 29 December, with Wales recording the heaviest of the snow showers; some rural areas recording up to 30 centimetres (12 in). Snow was also reported in parts of the West Midlands region and Yorkshire.

On 30 December, Sportscotland Avalanche Information Service (SAIS) issued warnings about conditions on Scottish mountains. However, three people died in three large avalanches. Two climbers were killed as a result of a snow slide on Ben Nevis, while a man was airlifted from Liathach (a mountain in Torridon) after getting into trouble, but died in hospital.

Continued icy weather in Scotland on New Year's Eve led to the cancellation of Hogmanay celebrations in Inverness, amid concerns over public safety; New Year celebrations in other parts of Scotland went ahead as planned. Northeast Scotland experienced fresh snowfall during the afternoon and evening of 31 December. For a second time that week Inverness Airport was closed, forcing several hundred passengers to make alternative arrangements. In Batley, West Yorkshire, 2,500 gallons of water leaked into the local gas network; 400 homes in Dewsbury and Batley were without gas during subzero temperatures. The final homes were reconnected on 7 January. There was also heavy snowfall in Dublin, Ireland, leading to the closure of Dublin Airport for several hours disrupting flights. In Dublin, the snow began 10 minutes before the New Year's Eve countdown.

== January 2010 ==
=== 1–5 January ===
Fresh overnight snowfall on New Year's Eve and New Year's Day caused disruption in North East England, Cumbria and the Scottish Borders. In some places it was as deep as 10 centimetres (3.9 in), and motorists were warned not to travel unless absolutely necessary. On 2 January, the synoptic position settled with the jet stream in a route causing a blocking high in the eastern Atlantic. This diverted warm west winds to the south over the Mediterranean and subjected western Europe to cold north winds, warm weather around the Caspian Sea and unusually cold weather in China. A weather front brought heavy snow to north west England. In Britain many roads were closed, including part of the M9.

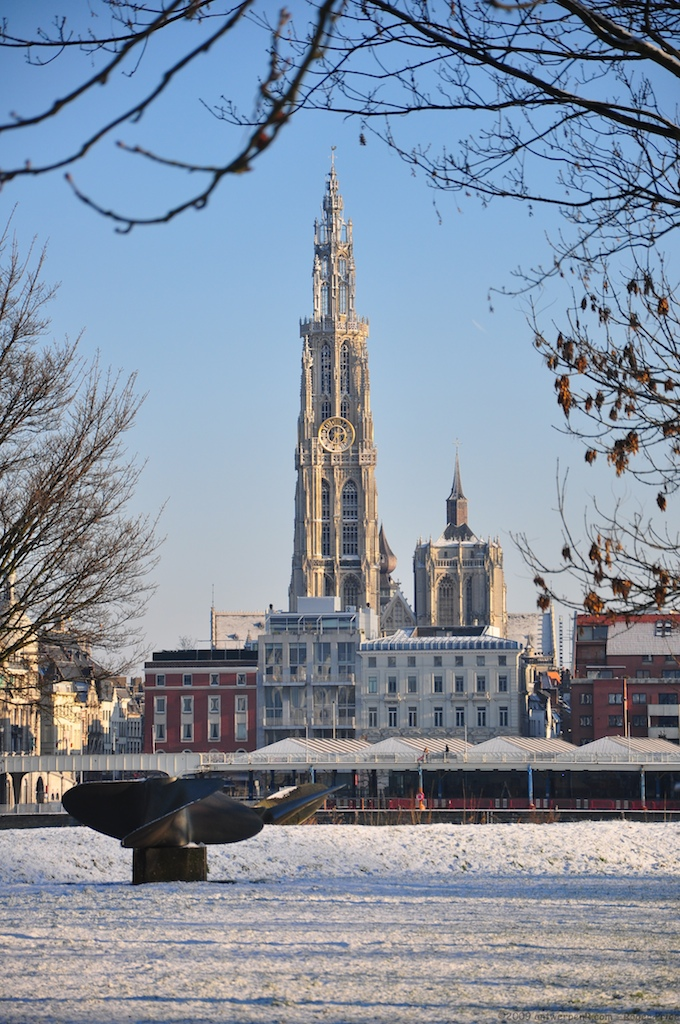
Antwerp, Belgium, 3 January 2010

On 3 January parts of northeast England and Cumbria had 6 centimetres (2.4 in) of snow, and Edinburgh had 9 centimetres (3.5 in). Europe's largest private-sector weather business, MeteoGroup, announced that the previous month was the coldest December (on average) since 1996. Temperatures remained very cold throughout Ireland and Britain; however, Inverness Airport reopened after several days. It was announced that due to the cold snap, it would be illegal to shoot certain game birds. An all-time snow record in the Estonian capital, Tallinn, was measured at 62 cm (two feet).

The next day in Scotland, Fife Council became the first local council to confirm that its supplies of grit were exhausted after it received less than it had ordered from suppliers. Ministers denied there was a shortage of grit and salt, insisting there were "very substantial" supplies for Scotland's roads. In its monthly summary Met Éireann, Ireland's weather service, said December was the coldest month for 28 years for most of the country and the coldest of any month since February 1986 at several stations. Wintry conditions returned to Europe, as much of the Northern Hemisphere was gripped by intensely cold weather. 13 people died in Poland, bringing the total number of cold-related deaths in Poland to 122. In Switzerland, ten skiers were reported dead or missing in avalanches. The worst incident occurred in the Diemtig Valley; avalanches hit a group of skiers and their rescuers, killing four people (including a doctor). Eight people were rescued, although three remained missing.

On 5 January, the Met Office issued weather warnings for every region in the UK except the Northern Isles. An extreme-weather warning was issued in the southern areas for overnight snowfall, which could bring accumulations from 25 to 40 centimetres (9.8 to 15.7 in). BBC Weather and the Met Office also warned that temperatures in the Highlands of Scotland could drop to −20 °C (−4 °F) later in the week. The Met Office also confirmed that the UK is experiencing the longest prolonged cold spell since 1981. 48 centimetres (19 in) of snow fell in Aviemore, Scotland, and 3 to 4 feet (0.91 to 1.22 m) of snow was recorded within the Cairngorms National Park. Most of Scotland had further snowfall during the night of 4–5 January.

=== 6–9 January ===
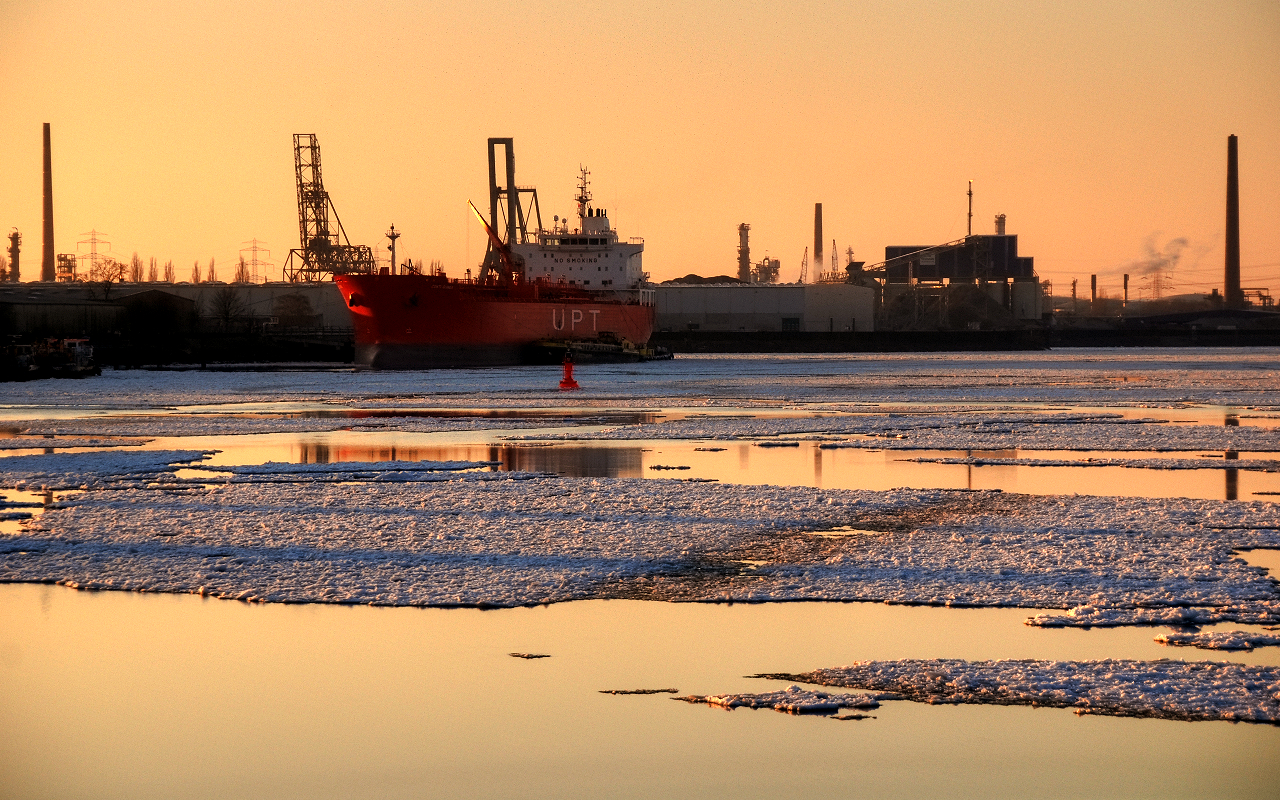
Port of Hamburg, Germany, 6 January 2010

The synoptic situation in northern Europe settled into a steady northeast wind, which brought snow showers and belts of snow. The British Army had to help stranded motorists in southern areas. The Met Office confirmed that 40 centimetres (16 in) of snow fell in some parts of southern England. A severe warning issued by the Met Office was in place for every region in the UK. Scottish First Minister Alex Salmond said Scotland was experiencing its worst winter since 1963. Further deaths in Wales, Shetland and Aberdeenshire were recorded. Hawick and most of the southern Scottish Borders was cut off from the rest of the country for two days, and roads in the southeast of England were left with traffic jams and abandoned cars. 8,000 schools were closed.

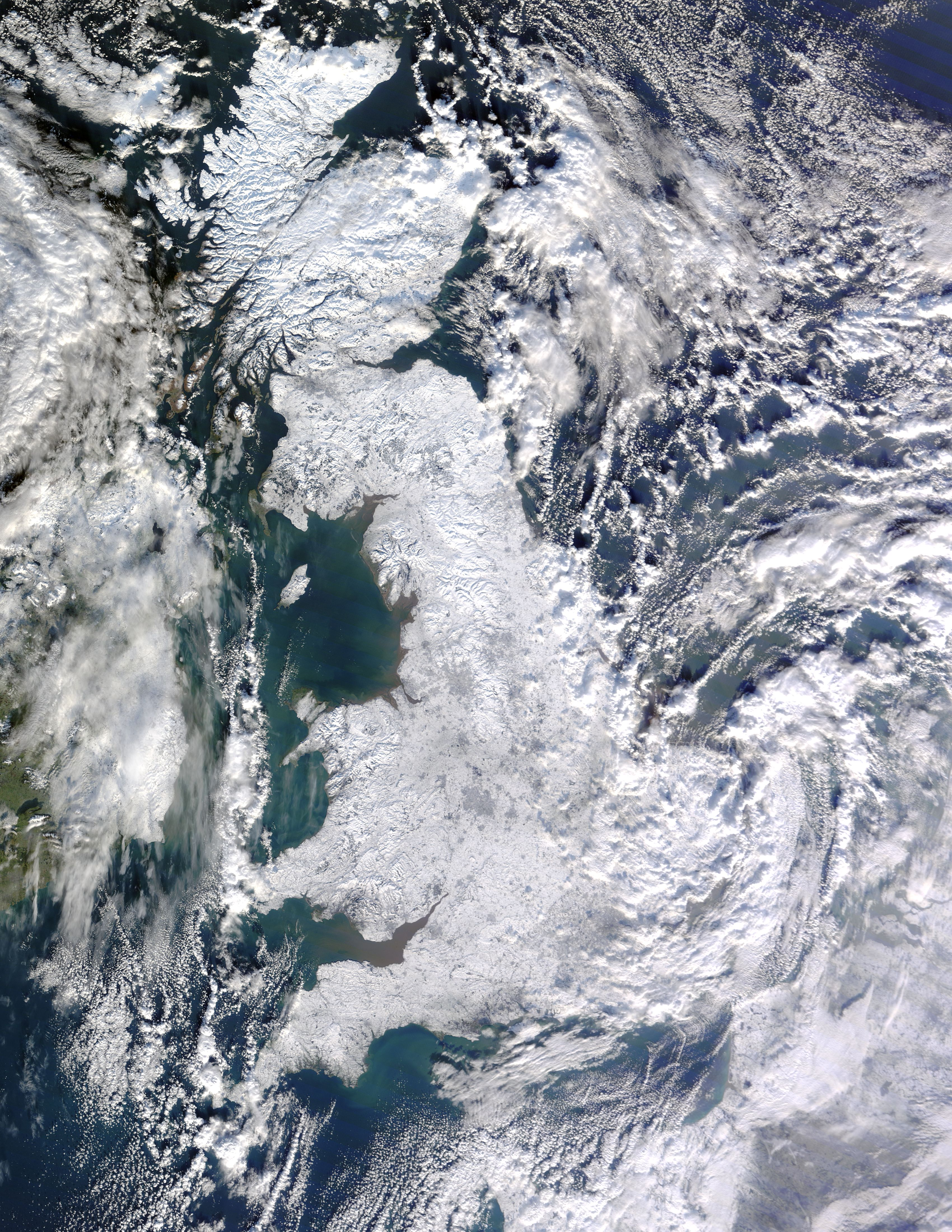
Satellite picture showing extent of snow cover across Great Britain and Ireland on 7 January

The lowest registered temperature on 7 January in Sweden was −40.8 °C (−41.4 °F) in Hemavan.

In the Netherlands and Belgium, road salt used to keep the roads clear of snow and ice was running out.

National and secondary schools in Ireland were supposed to open after the Christmas break on this day; however, many were forced to close because of weather conditions. On 8 January, the Minister for Education announced that all schools were to remain closed until at least Thursday, 14 January. On the Luas Green line there were difficulties getting up slopes, such as those between Harcourt and Charlemont and between Beechwood and Cowper. This had caused some delays (especially when salt was scarce for sand tanks on the trams) for Dublin pedestrians. Major reservoirs in County Cork, County Dublin and County Limerick were critically low; in areas such as County Laois and the rural areas of County Cork, bottled water was supplied by the Irish army. This had also been done for the people affected by floods in October and November 2009. The National Grid issued its second alert in three days, asking suppliers to provide more gas and some businesses to switch to other power sources, as gas usage hit record levels.

BBC News reported heavy snowfall as far south as Granada, Spain on 8 January. A new record of −9 °C (16 °F) was also recorded in Dublin, Ireland. Temperatures in County Limerick dropped to −11.1 °C (12.0 °F). In Kuusamo, Finland, the lowest registered temperature was −37.1 °C (−34.8 °F). In Norway, the temperature dropped to −42.4 °C (−44.3 °F) at Tynset. In Germany more than 30 centimetres (12 in) of snow fell on the island of Rügen, and the entire country was blanketed in snow. German officials also acknowledged a shortage of grit, and feared that high winds and drifting snow would lead to road closures. In France, officials closed Autoroute 35 for trucks because of heavy snow, and over 400 truck drivers bound for Germany had to make an unscheduled overnight stop. In the early morning hours of 9 January, the autoroute was also closed to cars. The storm also grounded 160 flights at the Frankfurt am Main international airport. Snow fell heavily in some parts of Spain. Prades (Tarragona, southern Catalonia) sported a 120 cm snow cover after a 30-plus- hour storm, which led to an 18-hour closure of the AP7 motorway at La Jonquera (at the Spanish/French border).

Overnight temperatures of −22.3 °C (−8.1 °F) were recorded in Altnaharra in the Scottish Highlands.

Deal and Sandwich in Kent, England, were virtually cut off by snowdrifts on 9 January. Snow showers persisted in the east of the UK. In the far south east, snow showers merged into longer and more persistent areas of snow. A low temperature of −14.5 °C (5.9 °F) was recorded at Tulloch Bridge. The football schedule was also heavily affected by the snowfall; all but seven games (two in both the Premier League and League 1 and three in the Championship) were postponed in England, and all but five Scottish Cup games were played in Scotland. Several Guinness Premiership games and horse-racing meets were cancelled as well. Dublin Airport was closed once again. Flights to Kraków in southern Poland were diverted to the airport in Katowice, due to fog which prevented planes from landing. Met Éireann issued a weather warning with up to 10 centimetres (3.9 in) of snow forecast.

Belgium was covered with another thick layer of snow, in some central provinces (such as Flemish Brabant) as deep as 10 centimetres (3.9 in). Since the snow (and possible traffic chaos) had been forecast for several days, this resulted in few people leaving their homes; traffic accidents were minor and few. At Brussels Airport slight delays were inevitable, but mostly the result of airports in neighbouring countries coping with heavier snow. In Denmark, army personnel carriers were once again deployed in the southern part of the country to assist emergency services as drifting continued to cause traffic problems.

=== 10–26 January ===
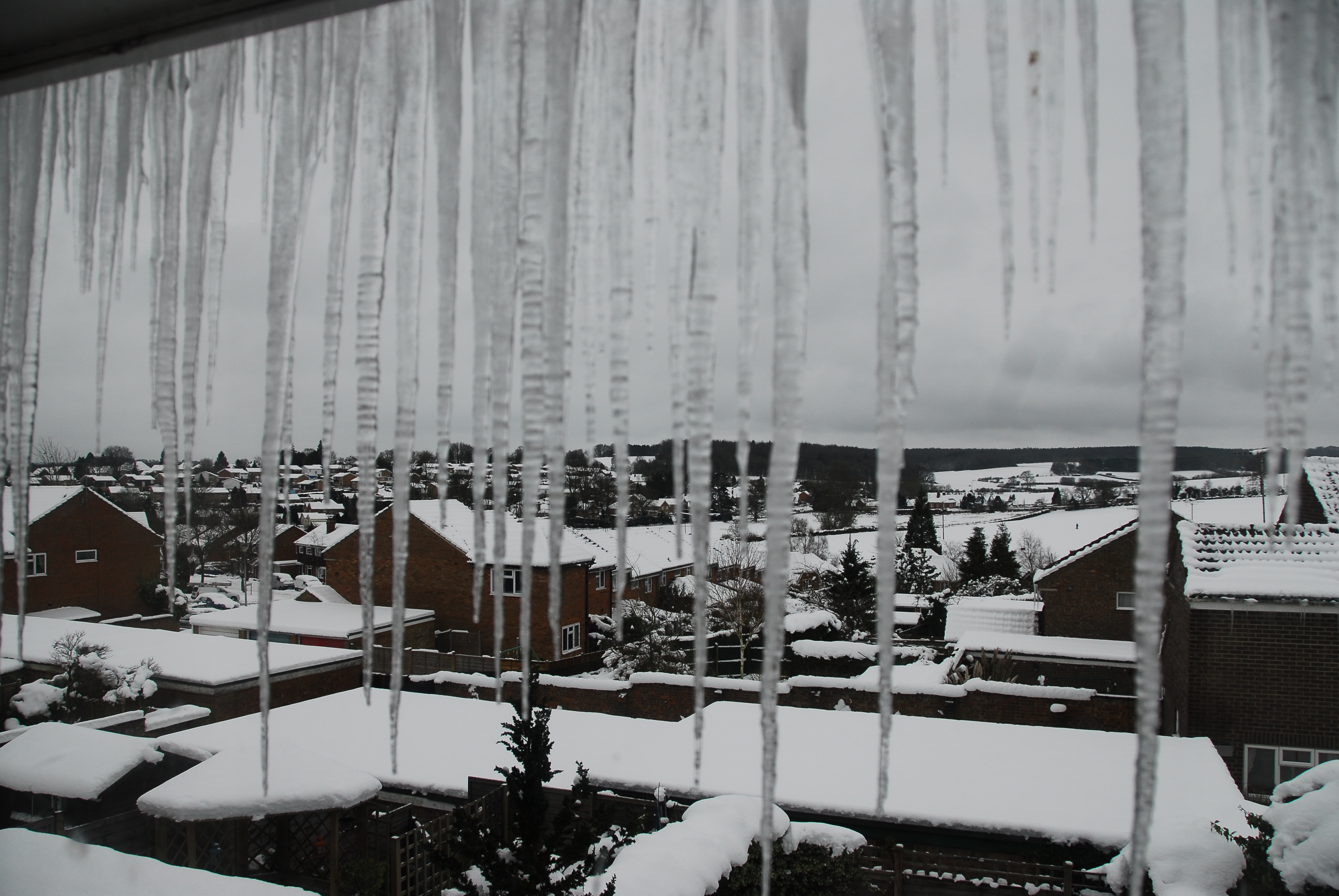
Alton, England, 10 January 2010

A large depression moved into the Western Approaches from the Atlantic on 10 January and began to infiltrate the coldest areas of Britain, bringing a thaw to southwest England. The weather in London cleared, allowing for transport access (particularly by road) across all areas of north and central London. A heavy snowstorm, named "Daisy", struck northern Germany on 9 and 10 January. Especially along the coast and on the islands of Usedom, Rügen and Fehmarn, snowdrifts made roads, parts of the coastal autobahn and rail tracks impassable. In northern Mecklenburg-Vorpommern and eastern Schleswig-Holstein secondary roads were closed and trains cancelled, while snowplows and excavators struggled to keep the main routes free. Since the storms were accumulating increasingly large snowbanks, hundreds of cars were stranded on Autobahn 20 near Jarmen during the night, and a train derailed after striking a snowbank near Miltzow. In Denmark, drifting continued to disrupt traffic in the southern part of the country; army personnel carriers were used to assist emergency services. In Spain, a snowstorm swept the country; Madrid had more than 10 hours of snow. Parts of southern Spain, such as Seville, saw their first snow since 1954 or Mérida since 1983

On 11 January, England and Wales continued to feel the effects of the depression in the Western Approaches. In the Republic of Ireland, the Department of Education ordered all schools to close for the day due to heavy snowfall.

Due to a mix of bitter cold and the milder system trying to push in from the Atlantic, heavy snowfall in the United Kingdom resumed; there were fresh accumulations (on top of existing snow) of up to 15 centimetres (6 inches) on 12 January in Wales and South West England. Snow later fell in The Midlands and South-east England. In Holmfirth and Barnsley in north England, freezing rain or sleet fell onto deep-frozen roads; this created so much black ice that some people found that the only safe way to move about on roads was by crawling. Hospital accident and emergency units in the Sheffield, Rotherham and Barnsley areas of South Yorkshire reported being inundated by people with fractures and sprains after slipping on what one Council official in Sheffield described as the worst black ice seen in the area in living memory.

Many schools were again closed across England and Wales, and there were many road accidents and closures. The M25 motorway was down to one lane between Leatherhead and Reigate; roads across southern Great Britain were untreated, wreaking havoc on commuters. Gatwick and Birmingham airports were closed, and many flights were delayed at Heathrow. During 13 January the weather system continued north, affecting much of Northern England before reaching Scotland. Parts of northern France were also affected by snowfall. At least 22 people died due to lower temperatures in Romania over a five-day period.

By the end of January in southern Sweden, temperatures had failed to exceed 0 °C (32 °F) at any time during the month in the major cities in the Mälar valley, including the capital Stockholm as well as other cities such as Uppsala, Västerås and Örebro. Remarkably enough that even spread further south to inland cities in the deep south such as Växjö and Ljungby. Although temperatures were lower than usual, no actual cold records were broken, but even temperatures in marine climate areas such as in Malmö plummeted below −15 °C (5 °F) during the coldest nights. All of Sweden's official stations averaged below 0 °C (32 °F) in terms of daily high, which is highly unusual. The cold in the large cities were relatively moderated, but Örebro some way inland had a −10 °C (14 °F) mean, which is normal for areas much further north.

== February ==
=== 12 February ===
Arctic air entering the Mediterranean Sea brought snowfalls across Italian western coasts. Snow covered Rome with a couple of inches, with some flurries reaching Naples. An extremely rare snowfall occurred in Cagliari, Sardinia.

=== 20 February ===
At least 43 people were killed after more than a month's worth of rain fell in southern Madeira in five hours during a strong Atlantic winter storm, producing severe flooding and mudslides. The unusual storm was fed by warmer-than-normal sea surface temperatures in the Northeastern Atlantic related to El Niño, and a slowing of the North Atlantic Gyre.

=== 26–28 February ===
At least 62 people were killed (51 in France) and 12 were missing during a European windstorm in Western Europe, affecting mainly Spain, France, Germany and the Benelux region. Numerous levees were breached in western France.

By the end of the month, the unusual cold had spread from primarily the south to the north of Sweden. Although winters of 1966 and 1985 were much colder, the average low of coastal Luleå still measured at −21.2 °C (−6.2 °F) and inland more southern locality Lycksele at −22.4 °C (−8.3 °F). Further south a night low of −29.7 °C (−21.5 °F) was measured in Gävle not far north of capital Stockholm. In the south, temperatures occasionally went above freezing, but average highs were firmly below freezing, except in the deep south where it hovered around the freezing point. From the beginning of March, temperatures rose to somewhat normal levels throughout the country.

== March ==
=== 8–10 March ===
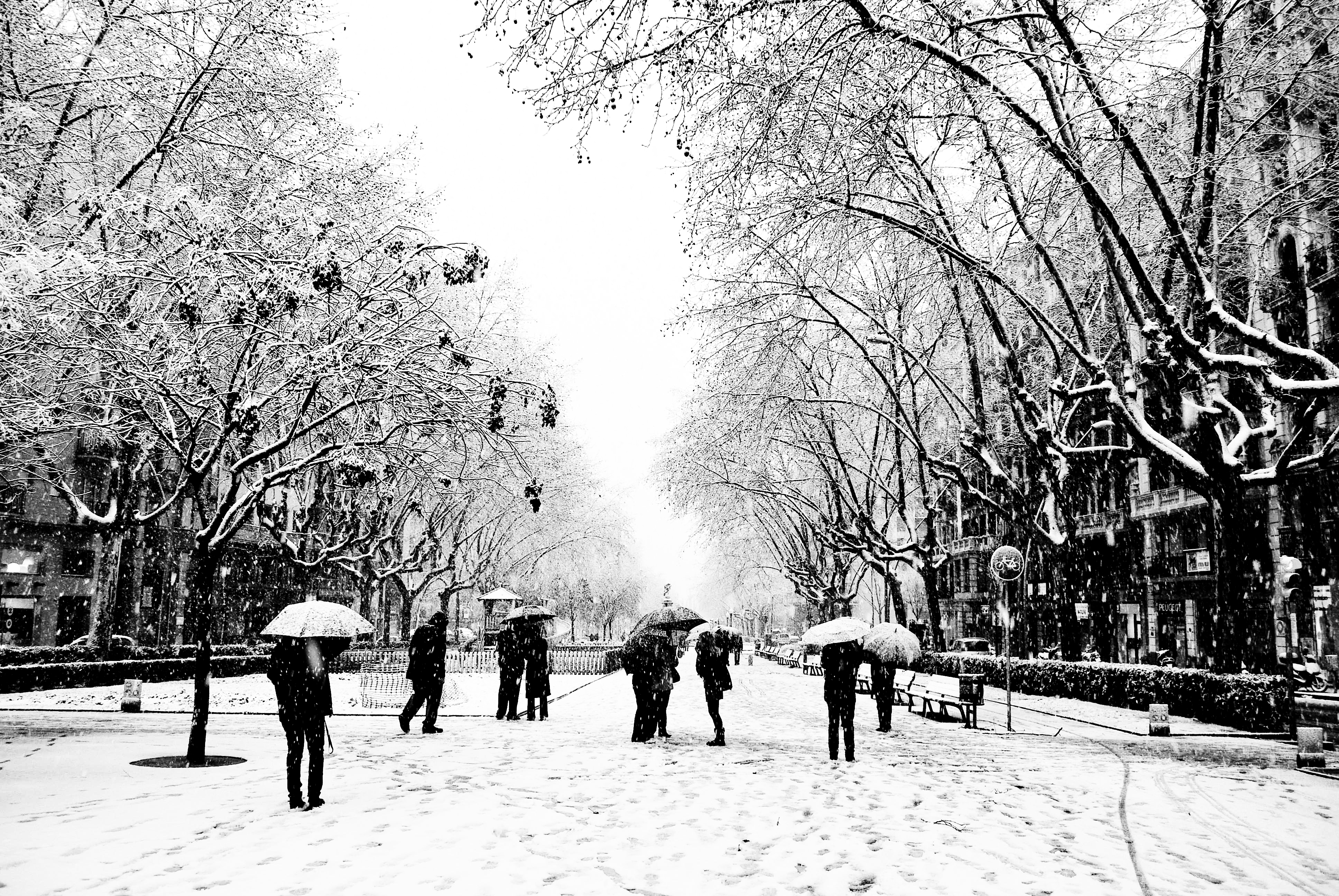
Barcelona on 8 March 2010

Heavy snowfall in Spain on 8 March left 220,000 people around the Catalan city of Girona without electricity due to a fault in a high-tension power cable. The adverse weather cut off railway lines and roads, and Spain's border with France at La Junquera was closed. Many schools cancelled classes on both 8 and 9 March. The snowfall was reported to be the heaviest in Barcelona since 1962. The storm also dumped snow on Mallorca and the Balearic Islands, causing snow and highway cancellations. Waves in the Mediterranean reached up to 7.7 m (25 ft) and winds reached 133 km/h (83 mph). Heavy snow up to 40 cm (16 in) fell in southern France (including Provence and the Pyrenees), forcing flight cancellations, airport and motorway closures. Over one metre of snow fell in the mountains, and numerous power outages occurred in Corsica. In Greece dust storms from the Sahara Desert reached the capital, Athens, on strong southerly winds. The eastern end of the storm coincided with the 2010 Elâzığ earthquake.

=== 12 March ===
A snowstorm dumped over 30 centimetres of snow in southern Germany (including Bavaria), causing numerous traffic accidents and over two dozen injuries.

=== 29 March – 1 April ===
A massive snowstorm travelled north through the UK until it reached Northern Ireland and Scotland, where it stayed for 61 hours. The Met Office issued emergency and extreme-weather warnings for Scotland and Northern Ireland for severe blizzards, very heavy snow, heavy rain, gale-force winds, and severe drifting. On 29 March, snow began to fall heavily over Scotland and Northern Ireland; however, the 30th was far more severe, as gusts up to 80 mph brought trees down. There were accumulations of 30–60 cm of snow in Northern Ireland and Scotland; 3 ft of snow fell on Aviemore.

On 31 March, a girl was killed in Lanarkshire when a school bus skidded on ice and crashed. Over 70,000 homes in Northern Ireland and Scotland were without power, and newborn lambs died in the extreme weather conditions. Thousands of cars were stranded on roads during the day; 300 cars were stranded in Northern Ireland by 5-foot snowdrifts. Strong winds brought down trees and created waves up to 20 ft. Caravans at Kingshorn were destroyed and a marina in the Lothians was bombarded and demolished by a surge of rain-driven waves. A seal at St. Andrews Sea Life Centre went missing in the strong waves, and a river in Musselburgh overflowed. This snow event was the second-most disruptive of this winter in the UK.

== Deaths ==
By 7 January 2010, 22 people died in the UK because of the freezing conditions. The Department of Health estimated that the cold weather could cause up to 40,000 excess deaths in the UK. 139 people died in Poland–most of them reportedly homeless.

== Effects on transport ==
=== United Kingdom ===
The following airports were at some point closed: Gatwick Airport, Heathrow Airport, Birmingham Airport, Cardiff Airport, Luton Airport, George Best Belfast City Airport, Southampton Airport, Blackpool Airport, Newcastle Airport, Durham Tees Valley Airport, Exeter Airport, Plymouth City Airport, London Stansted Airport, Liverpool John Lennon Airport, Manchester Airport, Leeds Bradford Airport, Robin Hood Airport Doncaster Sheffield and Bristol Airport. Some train services ran with revised timetables. Trains in Kent were delayed for up to three and a half hours, with hundreds of travellers left stranded. In late December, Eurostar trains from Paris or Brussels towards St Pancras station were severely delayed, with delays of up to 16 hours. All Eurostar services were cancelled from 19 to 21 December; delays and service cancellations continued after that.

Buses on the Isle of Wight, Gloucester (skeleton service was being run in Gloucester during Wednesday 6 January) and across southern Hampshire were suspended on 5 January owing to heavy snowfall, leaving a large number of people stranded. Limited services were back in operation on 7 January in Southampton and Portsmouth on the mainland and between Newport and the other main towns on the Isle of Wight. All services in Gosport, Fareham, Locks Heath, Titchfield, Whiteley and Warsash areas were suspended and remained so for two days because of road conditions. As of 8 January, one service was running between Gosport and Fareham and one between Fareham and Southampton (although this service was unable to serve Locks Heath or Titchfield). The A3 and the A3(M) around Horndean and the Hindhead area and the A1 experienced disruption; many minor roads were closed and only the main motorway and A-road network were passable for much of 5, 6 and 7 January. In North East England the A1(M) and A19 suffered challenging conditions (mainly in the evenings and at night) as a result of temperatures dropping to well below zero Celsius. Bus service between Newcastle and Sunderland experienced some disruption, as local operators suspended services but the Tyne and Wear Metro was an alternative which was only subject to delays due to the temperatures.

=== Ireland ===
Local and minor roads were severely affected. Dublin Airport closed on Wednesday, 6 January and again on Friday, 8 January. Cork Airport closed on Sunday, 10 January at 6:30 pm and did not reopen until 12:30 pm on Monday, 11 January. Dublin Bus temporarily cancelled all services, and Ireland West Airport also closed. All schools were ordered to close for a day on Monday 11 January, due to the snow. Dublin's tram service Luas was badly affected; most drivers and bus riders were afraid to travel on the ice-covered roads.

=== Finland ===
Long-distance railway traffic to and from Helsinki halted between 19 and 22 February. Cold weather, blizzards and drifting snow blocked 300 rail switches at the Ilmala rail yard, making traffic impossible. More than half the long-distance trains were cancelled, leaving hundreds of Lapland-bound winter holiday travellers stranded at Helsinki Central Railway station. Trains which were not cancelled ran several hours late. The amount of snow cleared from Helsinki streets and transferred to snow collection sites was 210,000 truckloads.

=== Denmark, Norway and Sweden ===
Rail transport in Denmark, Norway and Sweden experienced serious setbacks throughout this Winter.

=== Economic impact ===
Winter vegetable crops such as cauliflower and potatoes were threatened by the icy temperatures, and harvesting of carrots, turnips, sugar beet and parsnips was delayed since the fields are frozen. The harsh winter was estimated to cost the economy of the United Kingdom £700 million. A new British record for natural gas consumption reached 454,000,000 cubic metres (1.60×10^{10} cu ft) on 7 January, according to the National Grid. Approximately 12,000 schools were closed across the United Kingdom. A drop in about 30% of UK retail sales was estimated, with uneven consequences; pubs, out-of-town shopping centres and department stores were worst affected. Local-store sales and the sale of sledges, cat litter and contraceptives increased. The Scottish Highlands saw a boost to tourism and winter sports. The Cairngorms, near Aviemore, received its best business since the 1970s as thousands of tourists visited the area.

=== Sporting events cancelled ===
The snowfall in January postponed football games in the English Football League, Premier League, Football League Cup and the FA Cup. There were further postponements in Scotland (with 15 football matches postponed on 2 January), and in Serie A, Serie B, Lega Pro Prima Divisione, Lega Pro Seconda Divisione and Serie D Italian football matches. Football in Northern Ireland was also affected. In rugby union, there were cancellations in the English Premiership, Celtic League, the All-Ireland League, the Top 14, a Heineken Cup fixture in Brussels scheduled for 19 December, and a Heineken Cup fixture in Newport. Other affected sports included Gaelic football's O'Byrne Cup, Dr. McKenna Cup, McGrath Cup and FBD League games. The field hockey Irish Junior Cup also saw postponements.

== See also ==
- March 2010 nor'easter
- 2010 Northern Hemisphere heat waves
- December 2009 North American blizzard
- Arctic dipole anomaly
- Climate of Europe
- Global storm activity of 2009
- Global storm activity of 2010
- North Atlantic Current
- Polar vortex
- Siberian High
- February 2009 Great Britain and Ireland snowfall
- Winter of 1990–91 in Western Europe
- Winter of 2010–11 in Europe
