= 1987 United Kingdom and Ireland cold wave =

Weather event in the UK and Ireland

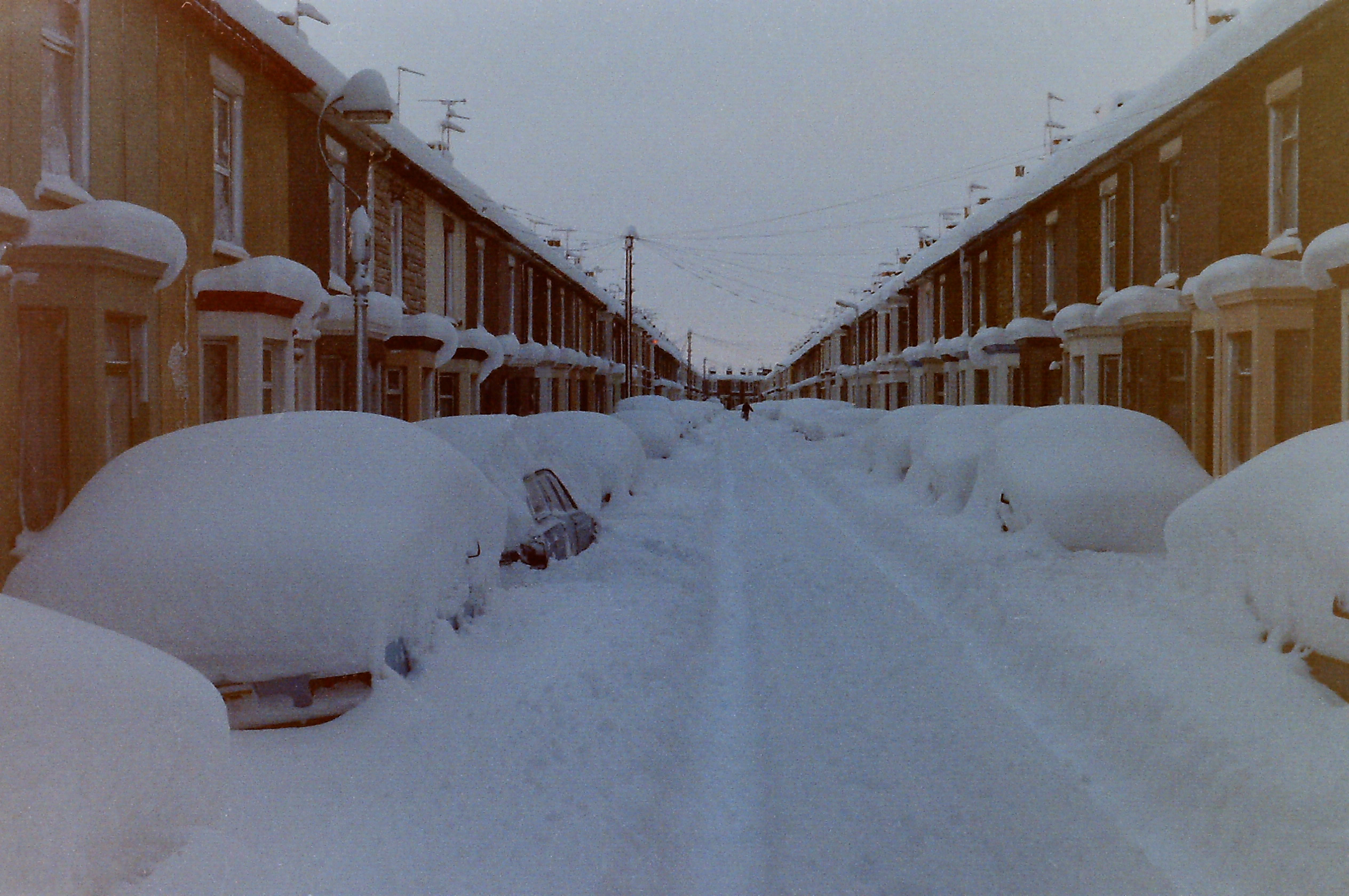
- Snow-covered street in Sheerness

Meteorological history
- Formed: 7 January 1987
- Dissipated: 20 January 1987

Cold wave
- Lowest temperature: −23.3 °C (−9.9 °F) (13 January 1987, Caldecott, Rutland)

Overall effects
- Areas affected: United Kingdom and Ireland

The January 1987 snowfall (also known as the Big Freeze of 1987) was a very heavy lake-effect type snow event that affected the United Kingdom, mainly the areas of East Anglia, South-East England and London between 11 and 14 January and was the heaviest snowfall to fall in that part of the United Kingdom since the winter of 1981/82. Over 50 centimetres (20 in) of snow fell in South East England, with some locations reporting snowfall at 75 centimetres (30 in). Ireland was also affected by the cold wave, reporting more than 10 centimetres (3.9 in) in some areas.

== United Kingdom ==
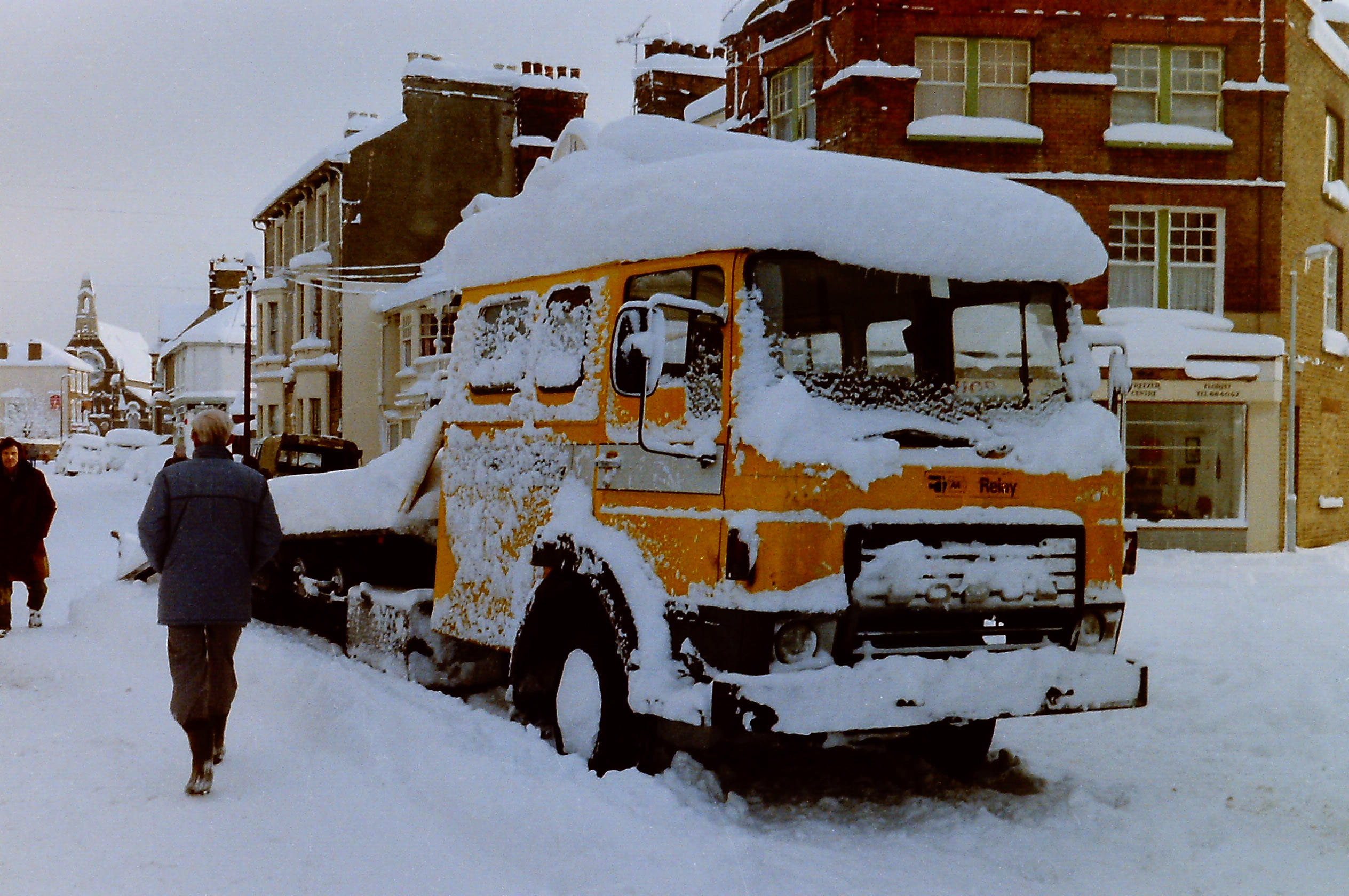
AA truck covered in snow

During the cold wave, more than 50 centimetres (20 in) of snow fell in parts of Kent, Essex, London and Surrey, and the North Downs reported more than 75 centimetres (30 in). Parts of West Cornwall also had heavy falls. Several towns were cut off due to the heavy snowfall including the Isle of Sheppey which needed airlifts during the height of the storm.

This was due to a high pressure system over Siberia that moved into Scandinavia which in turn dragged a strong easterly airflow and brought very cold temperatures across Europe and the United Kingdom. A low pressure system over Italy caused the airflow to drag the very cold air from Siberia to Western Europe and picked up further moisture from the North Sea which produced the heavy snowfall. This caused serious disruption of transport in the area including the cancellation of many train services and the closure of many roads and railway lines. Motoring organisations had to deal with more than 4000 car breakdowns and 500 schools were forced to close. The extreme cold even affected the chiming hammer of Big Ben and at Southend-on-Sea the sea froze over.

The cold spell lasted from the 7th to the 20th of January, with temperatures remaining well below freezing on many days. On the 12th, maximum temperatures were between −6 °C (21 °F) and −8 °C (18 °F) over much of England, with −9.1 °C (15.6 °F) the daily maximum at Warlingham. The lowest overnight temperature of −23.3 °C (−9.9 °F) was recorded at Caldecott, Rutland, making it the coldest recorded temperature in the East Midlands.

== Ireland ==
In Ireland, the amount of snowfall was far less pronounced, but had a similar weather pattern to the United Kingdom. The amount of snowfall was greater in areas further inland than coastal areas. Around 12 centimetres (4.7 in) of snow was recorded in the Irish Midlands and the East of Ireland, with some places recording snowfall as high as 19 centimetres (7.5 in) in the east.

At Roche's Point Lighthouse, Cork Harbour, 12 centimetres (4.7 in) of snow was reported, and is the highest depth of snow since snow observations began at this location in 1961. As well as the snow record, the temperature dropped down to −7.2 °C (19.0 °F) on 13 January, and is the coldest temperature recorded at Roche's Point since record observations began in 1867. It's also likely that this figure marks the coldest temperature during the cold wave.

== See also ==
- Winter of 1990–91 in Western Europe
