= Armageddon (disambiguation) =

Armageddon is, according to the Bible, the site of a battle during the end times.

Armageddon may also refer to:

== Films ==
- Armageddon (1997 film), a Hong Kong film starring Andy Lau
- Armageddon (1998 film), an American disaster film starring Bruce Willis, Ben Affleck and Liv Tyler
- Armaguedon, a 1977 film directed by Alain Jessua
- Deathline or Armageddon, a 1997 science fiction action film starring Rutger Hauer
- Warlock: The Armageddon, a 1993 American horror film
- Ricky Gervais: Armageddon, a 2023 Netflix stand-up special by Ricky Gervais
- 2025 Armageddon, a 2022 science-fiction monster film produced by The Asylum

== Games ==
- Armageddon chess, a variant of chess
- Armageddon (MUD), a multi-player text-based online roleplaying game running since 1991
- Mortal Kombat: Armageddon, a 2006 video game in the Mortal Kombat series
- Red Faction: Armageddon, a 2011 video game in the Red Faction series
- Worms Armageddon, a 1999 video game in the Worms series
- Worms 2: Armageddon, a 2009 video game in the Worms series
- Armageddon: Tactical Combat, 3000-500 BC, a 1972 board wargame simulating Bronze Age warfare

== Literature ==
- Armageddon (novel), a 2003 novel in the Left Behind series by Tim LaHaye and Jerry Jenkins
- Armageddon: A Novel of Berlin, a 1964 novel by Leon Uris
- Armageddon (underground comic), a comic book published by Last Gasp
- Armageddon 2001, a crossover event in the DC universe
- Wildstorm: Armageddon, a crossover event in the Wildstorm universe
- Armageddon, a 2004 novel in the Dreamland series by Dale Brown with Jim DeFelice
- Armageddon, a 1997 Battlestar Galactica novel by Richard Hatch
- Armageddon (1988–92), a series of three novels by Robert Rankin
- Armageddon: The Battle for Germany 1944-45, a 2004 historical book by Max Hastings
- Armageddon: The Second World War, a 1995 historical book by Clive Ponting
- Armageddon? (1987), essay anthology by Gore Vidal

== Music ==
=== Performers ===
- Armageddon (British band), a 1970s hard rock supergroup
- Armageddon (Swedish band), a Swedish melodic death metal band
- Armageddon USA, commonly known as just Armageddon, an American heavy metal band
- Armageddon, a former member of the hip hop collective Terror Squad

=== Albums ===
- Armageddon (Aespa album) or the title song (see below), 2024
- Armageddon (Aria album), 2006
- Armageddon (Armageddon album), 1975
- Armageddon (Equilibrium album), 2016
- Armageddon (Guy Sebastian album) or the title song, 2012
- Armageddon (Prism album) or the title song, 1979
- Armageddon (Warkings album), 2025
- Armageddon: The Album, a soundtrack album from the 1998 film

=== Songs ===
- "Arma-goddamn-motherfuckin-geddon", also released as "Arma... geddon", by Marilyn Manson, 2009
- "Armageddon" (Aespa song), 2024
- "Armageddon" (From Ashes to New song), 2023
- IV. "Armageddon The Battle of Heart and Mind", by Rush, 1978
- "Armageddon", by Against Me! from Against Me!, 2001
- "Armageddon", by Alkaline Trio from From Here to Infirmary, 2001
- "Armageddon", by Altern-8 from Full On... Mask Hysteria, 1992
- "Armageddon", by Blue Stahli from The Devil, 2015
- "Armageddon", by Enforcer from Nostalgia, 2023
- "Armageddon", by Hirax from Faster than Death, 2025
- "Armageddon", by Primal Fear from Black Sun, 2002
- "Armageddon', by Trippie Redd from Mansion Musik, 2023
- "Armageddon", by War of Ages from Dominion, 2023
- "Armageddon", by Wayne Shorter from Night Dreamer, 1964

== Other uses ==
- Armageddon (beer), a beer brewed in Scotland
- Armageddon (convention), an annual New Zealand science-fiction and comics convention
- Armageddon – Les Effets Speciaux, an attraction at Disneyland Paris
- Getter Robo Armageddon, a 1998-9 OVA and manga
- WWE Armageddon, a former annual professional wrestling pay-per-view event
- "Armageddon", a 2019 episode of L.A.'s Finest

== See also ==
- Armageddon 2001, a 1991 DC Comics crossover event
- "The Battle of Armageddon" (Hank Williams song), a 1949 hymn
- Harmagedon (disambiguation)
- Carmageddon (disambiguation)
- Karmageddon (disambiguation)
- Armour-Geddon, a 1991 video game
