= Armageddon (comics) =

Armageddon, in comics, may refer to:

- Armageddon 2001, a 1991 DC Comics storyline
- Armageddon (Chaos! Comics), a Lady Death and Evil Ernie crossover
- Armageddon (underground comic), an underground comic by Barney Steel
- Wildstorm: Armageddon, a 2008 Wildstorm storyline
- Armageddon (Marvel Comics), a character in Marvel Comics

== See also ==
- Armageddon (disambiguation)
