= January 2011 North American blizzard =

January 2011 North American blizzard can refer to:

- January 8–13, 2011 North American blizzard
- January 25–27, 2011 North American blizzard
