= Washington DC Snowball Fight Association =

Organizer of snowball fights in Washington, D.C., United States

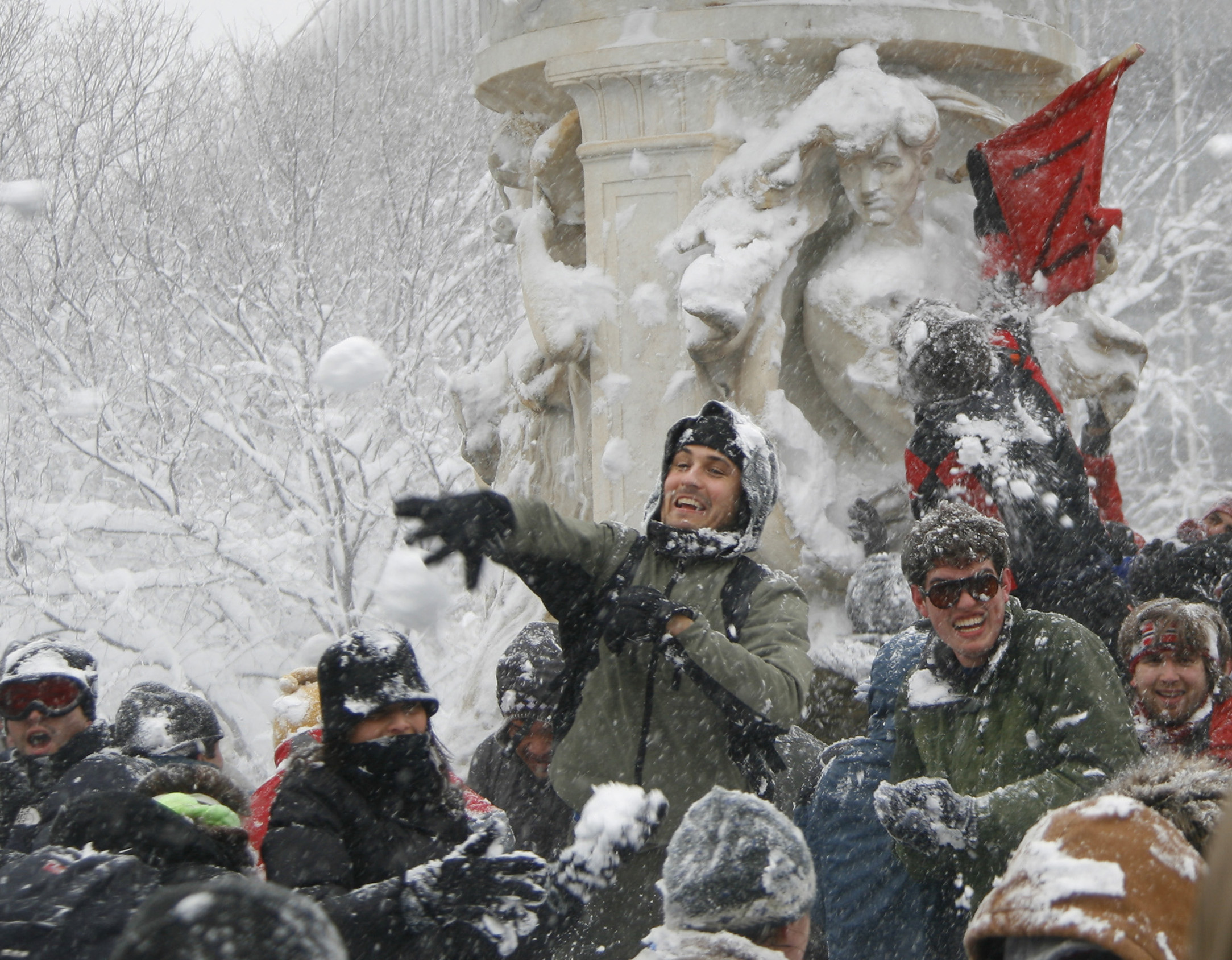
The first snowball fight organized by the group at the Dupont Circle Fountain on February 6, 2010

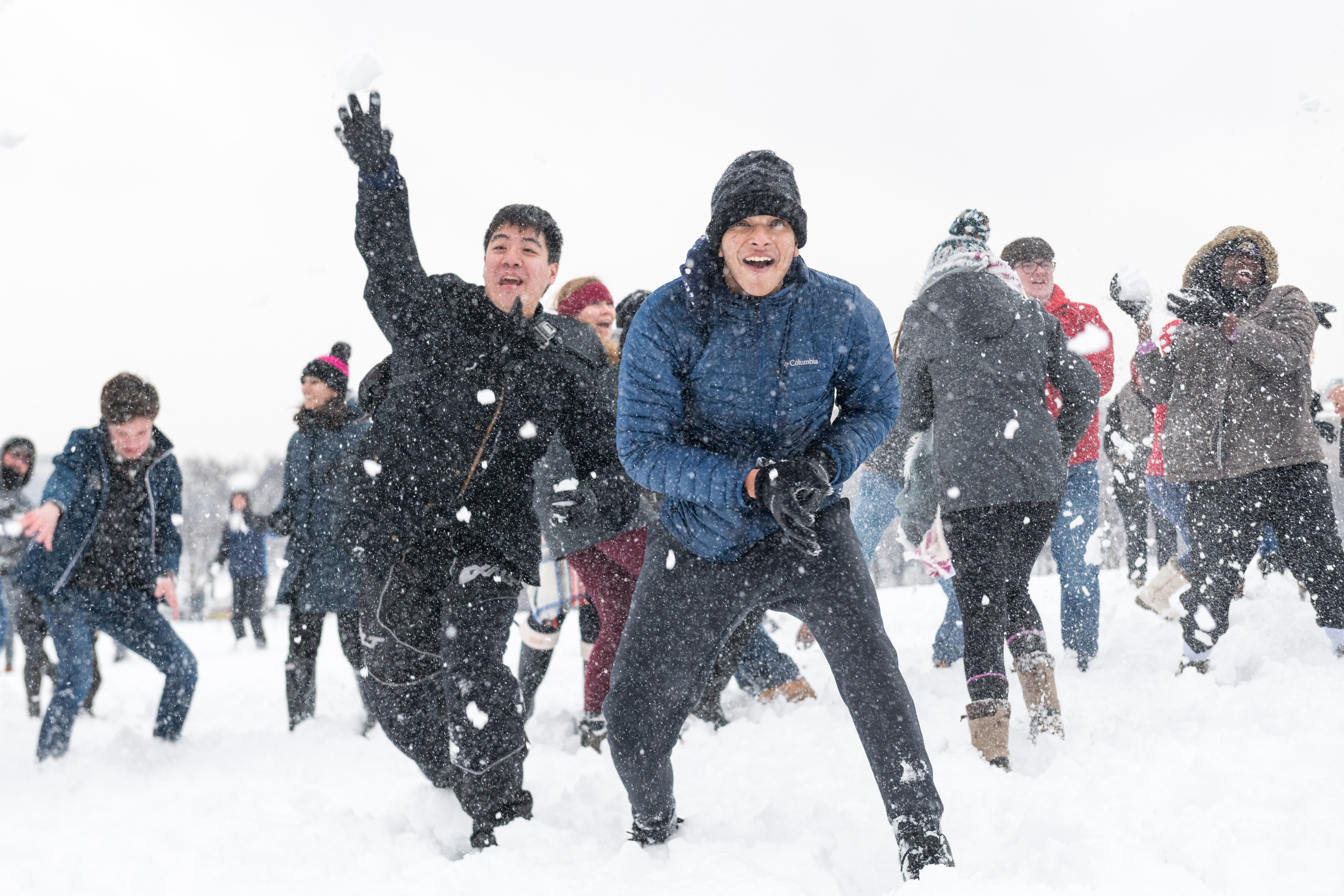
A DCSFA snowball fight on the National Mall in January 2019

The Washington DC Snowball Fight Association (DCSFA) is a loose group of residents of Washington, D.C., United States, who organize large-scale snowball fights via social media when the city gets significant amounts of snow. Initially organized by Michael Lipin and Ami Greener, the first large snowball fight occurred in Dupont Circle on February 6, 2010, after the region received more than 30 inches (760 mm) of snow during the February 5–6, 2010 North American blizzard. More than 5,000 people RSVPed to the snowball fight on Facebook, and around 2,000 attended.

The snowball fights have garnered local, national and international press attention and have become a local tradition. According to co-organizer Denis Baranov, for the DCSFA to schedule a fight requires at least four inches (100 mm) of snowfall, with the snow neither too flaky nor too wet.

== Snowball fights and locations ==
Following the first series of snowball fights during the record-setting 2009–2010 winter snowfall, DCSFA continued to organize events. It held large snowball fights in Dupont Circle during a January 2011 nor'easter, during the January 20–22, 2014 North American blizzard, during a March 2015 winter storm, and amid the January 2016 United States blizzard.

DCSFA organized snowball fights on the National Mall during a March 2014 winter storm, on January 13, 2019, in January 2021 during a nor'easter, and again during a January 2022 nor'easter. Meridian Hill (Malcolm X) Park became the site of a snowball fight during the February 14–15, 2015 North American blizzard.

The January 13–16, 2024 North American winter storm brought two DCSFA events, one on January 16, on the National Mall and a second four days later in Franklin Square, the first time since 2010 that the group had organized two in one week. During the January 5–6, 2025 United States blizzard, with up to a foot of snow forecast for Washington, a DCFSA snowball fight returned to Meridian Hill Park.

The DCSFA scheduled a snowball fight at the National Mall for January 25, 2026, during the January 2026 North American winter storm, but cancelled the event due to sleet.
