= Brewmeister =

Brewmeister may refer to

- Brewmaster or head brewer
- Brewmeister (brewery), the Scottish brewery
