= Harmagedon =

Harmagedon or Harmageddon may refer to:

- Har-Magedon, or Armageddon, the Biblical prophesied site of a battle during the end times
- Harmagedon (film), a 1983 Japanese animated adaptation of the manga series Genma Wars
- "Harmageddon", a 1998 song by Apocalyptica from Inquisition Symphony

== See also ==
- Armageddon (disambiguation)
