= Karmageddon =

Karmageddon may refer to:

- Karmageddon Media, a former Dutch independent record label
- "Karmageddon" (song), a single released by Iyah May in 2024
- Karmageddon, a periodic event organised by the Join Me movement
- Karmageddon, a 2009 album by Ravi Bissambhar
- "Karmageddon", a song by Soulfly on their 1998 self-titled debut album
- "Karmageddon", a song by Hank Williams III on his 2010 album Rebel Within
- "Karmageddon", a song by M.I.A. on her 2013 album Matangi

== See also ==
- Carmageddon (disambiguation)
