= 2010–11 North American winter =

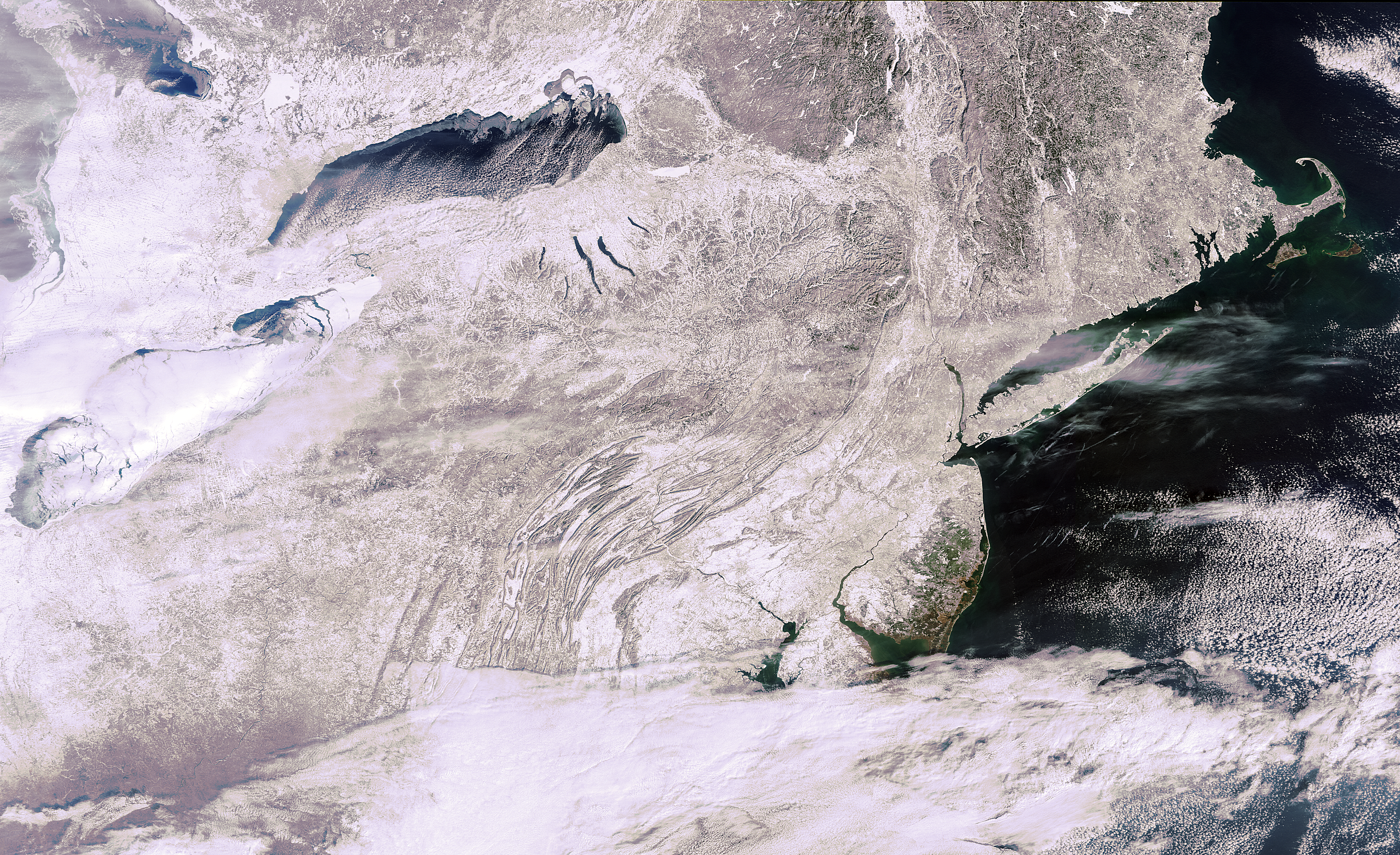
- Extensive snow cover across the Northeastern U.S. on January 31, 2011

Seasonal boundaries
- Meteorological winter: December 1 – February 28
- Astronomical winter: December 21 – March 20
- First event started: October 23, 2010
- Last event concluded: April 16, 2011

Most notable event
- Name: 2011 Groundhog Day blizzard
  - Duration: January 31–February 2, 2011
  - Lowest pressure: 996 mb (29.41 inHg)
  - Fatalities: 36 confirmed
  - Damage: $1.8 billion (2011 USD)

Seasonal statistics
- Total WPC-issued storms: 17 total
- Rated storms (RSI) (Cat. 1+): 12 total
- Major storms (RSI) (Cat. 3+): 3 total
- Maximum snowfall accumulation: 40.5 in (103 cm) at Savoy, Massachusetts
- Maximum ice accretion: 1 in (25 mm) at Cashtown, Pennsylvania
- Total fatalities: 56 total
- Total damage: Unknown

Related articles
- Winter of 2010–11 in Great Britain and Ireland

The 2010–11 North American winter was influenced by an ongoing La Niña, seeing winter storms and very cold temperatures affect a large portion of the Continental United States, even as far south as the Texas Panhandle. Notable events included a major blizzard that struck the Northeastern United States in late December with up to 2 feet (24 in) of snowfall and a significant tornado outbreak on New Year's Eve in the Southern United States. By far the most notable event was a historic blizzard that impacted areas from Oklahoma to Michigan in early February. The blizzard broke numerous snowfall records, and was one of the few winter storms to rank as a Category 5 on the Regional Snowfall Index.

While there is no well-agreed-upon date used to indicate the start of winter in the Northern Hemisphere, there are two definitions of winter which may be used. Based on the astronomical definition, winter begins at the winter solstice, which in 2010 occurred late on December 21 (early on December 22 in EST), and ends at the March equinox, which in 2011 occurred on March 20. Based on the meteorological definition, the first day of winter is December 1 and the last day February 28. Both definitions involve a period of approximately three months, with some variability.

== Seasonal forecasts ==
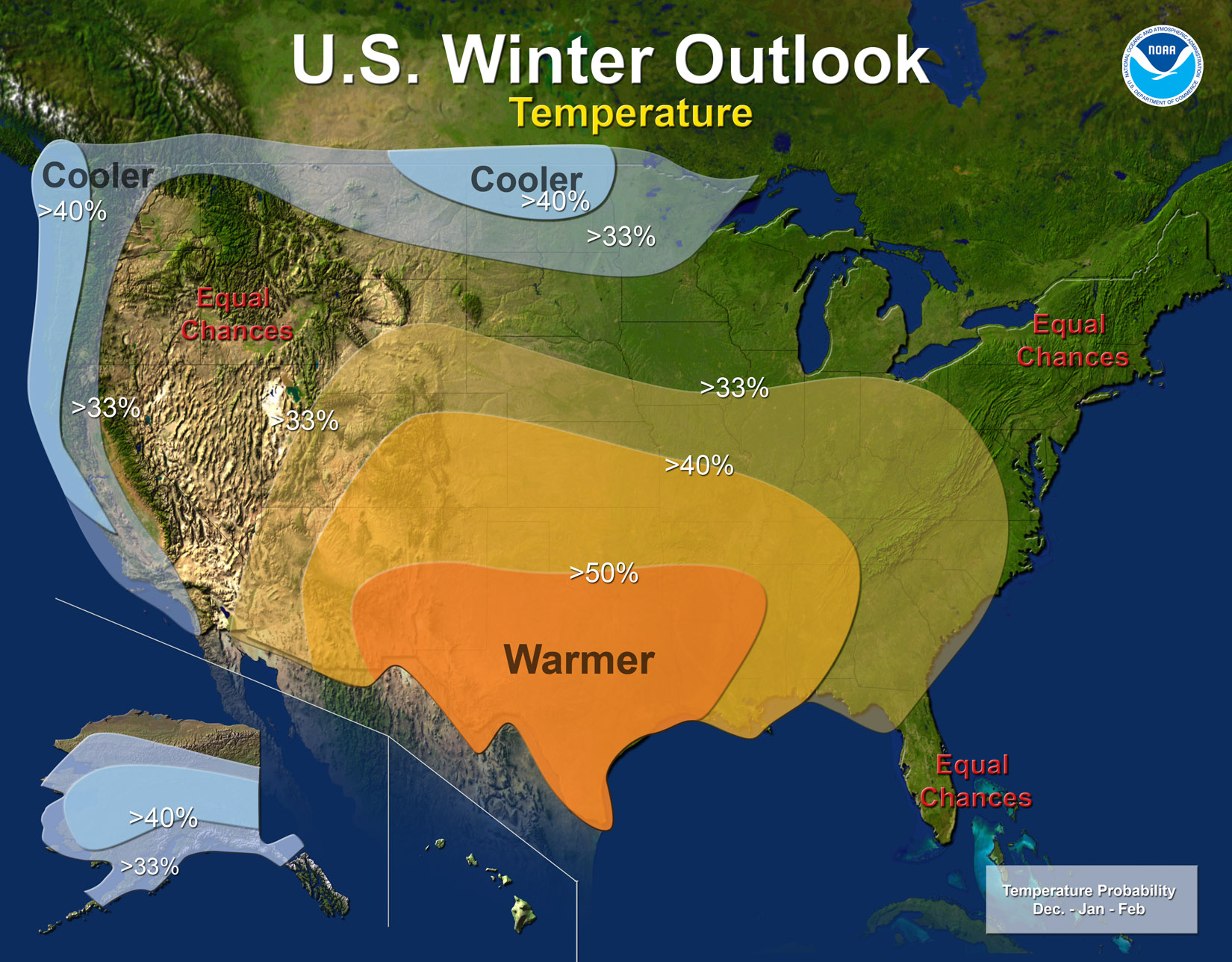
Temperature outlook

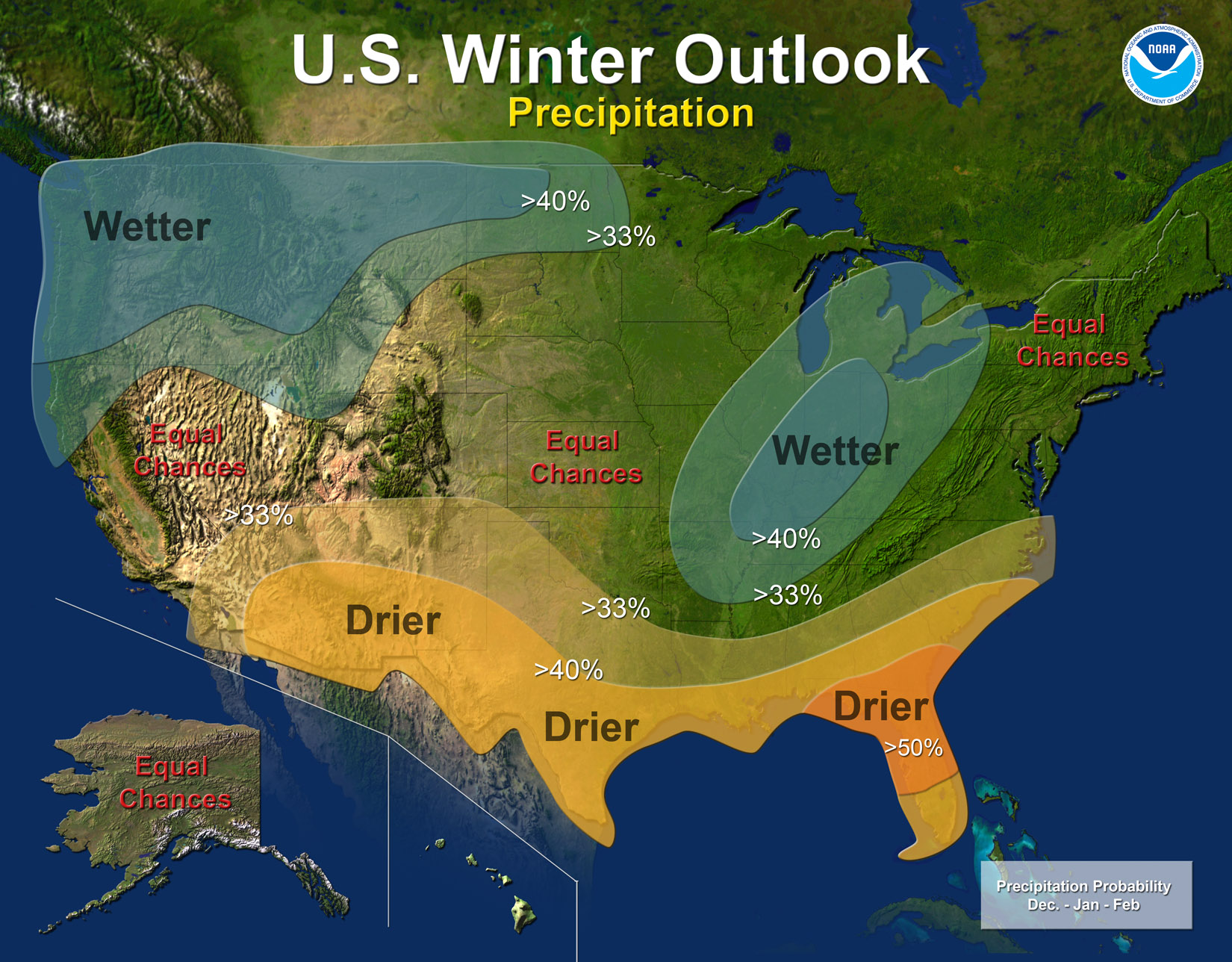
Precipitation outlook

On October 21, 2010, the National Oceanic and Atmospheric Administration's Climate Prediction Center issued its US winter outlook. It predicted a La Niña to form. The Outlook predicted colder and wetter than average winter for the Pacific Northwest and Northern plains. It also predicted that the Southern plains, Gulf States, Southwest and Southeast Regions receiving a warmer and drier winter season with Florida having equal chance of a below or above average temperatures. The central United States, Mid Atlantic and New England had equal chances of having below or above average temperature and precipitation. It predicted that Alaska would have colder than average temperatures with an equal chance for above average or below average precipitation. It predicted that Hawaii would be drier than average in November but Wetter December through February.

== Events ==
The 2010–2011 winter featured several significant storms, and one of them was a historic storm. A storm that spawned a devastating tornado outbreak in mid-April was responsible for a late-season blizzard in the Great Plains.

=== Late October bomb cyclone ===
- Category 0 "Nuisance" (RSI/NOAA: N/A)
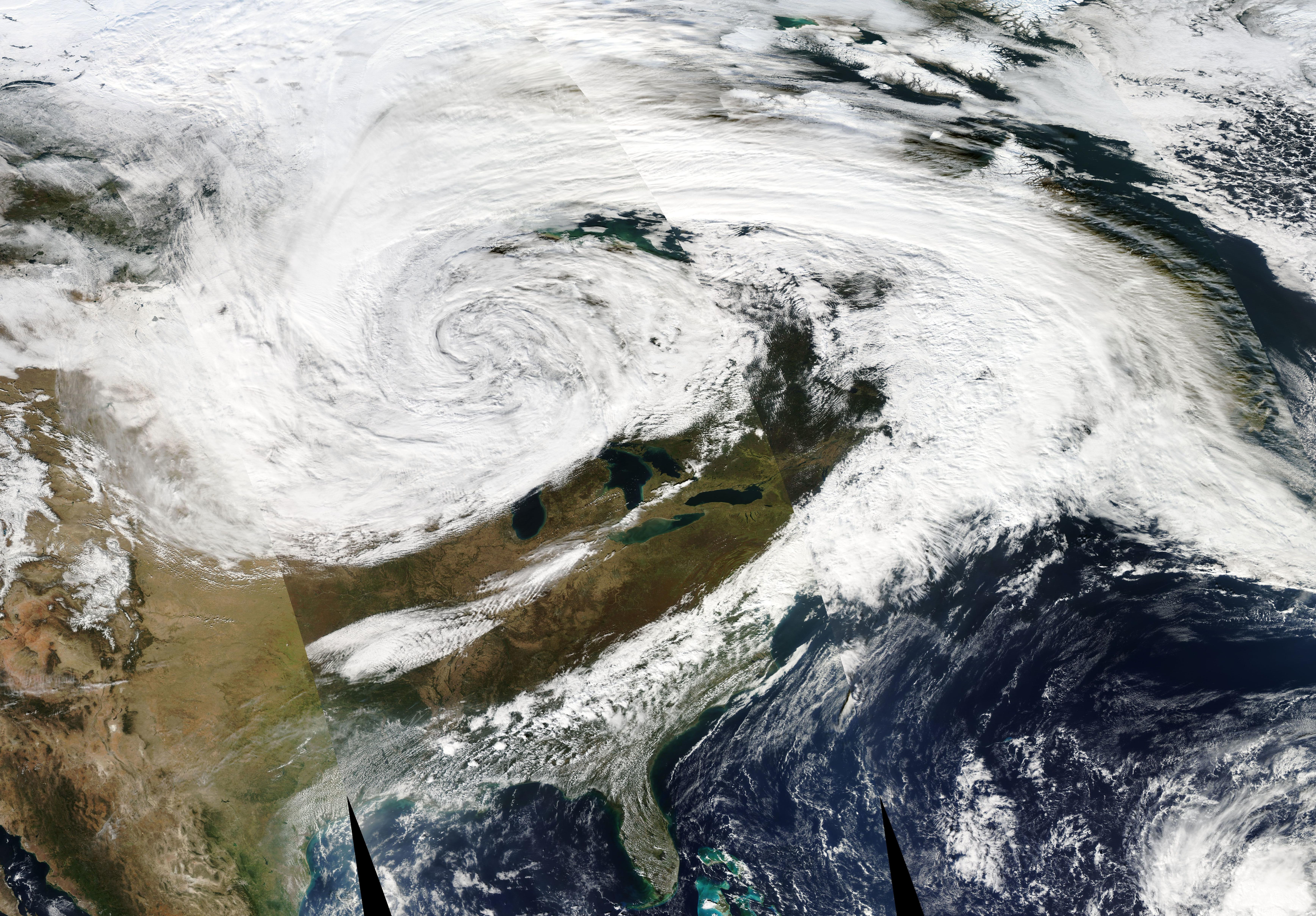
- Duration: October 24 – October 31, 2010
- Lowest pressure: 955.2 mb (28.21 inHg)
- Maximum snow: 9 in (23 cm)
- Fatalities: 1 fatalities
- Damage: $18.5 million (2010 USD)

In late October, a massive cyclone brought a serial derecho to a large portion of the United States, as well an early season blizzard to parts of the Midwest and Canadian Prairies from October 25 through October 28. Forming over the Upper Midwest, it intensified rapidly prompting the storm to be classified as a bomb cyclone which are more common over the ocean rather than over land. The massive storm across the entire country and up into Canada bringing a wide variety of weather. It was responsible for 69 tornadoes across the country with an EF2 being the highest category. It had its highest recorded winds in Nebraska at 70 mph (110 km/h) and the highest recorded snowfall totals being 9 in (23 cm) in St. Louis County, Minnesota.

=== Late December blizzard ===
- Category 2 "Significant" (RSI/NOAA: 3.27)
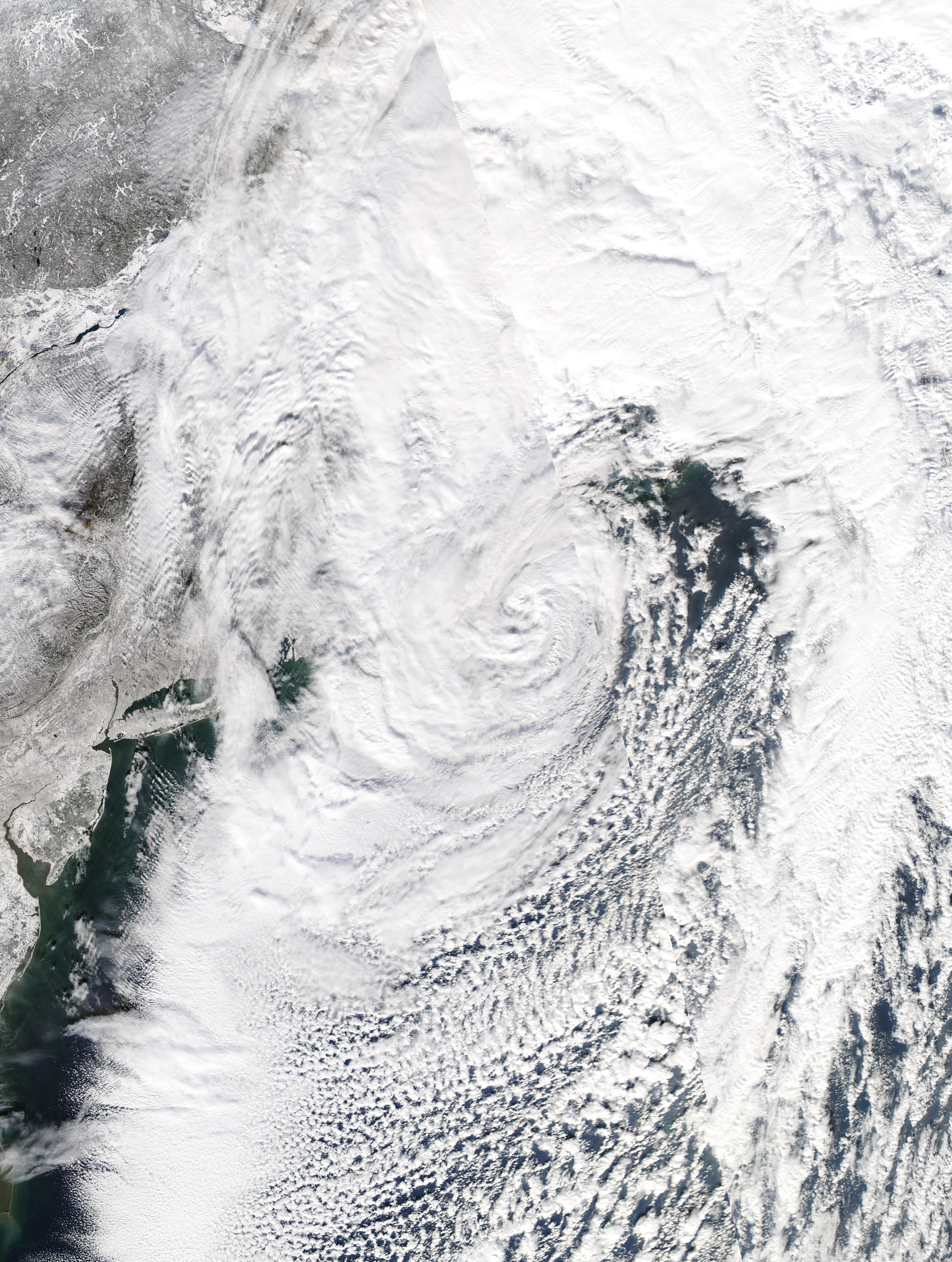
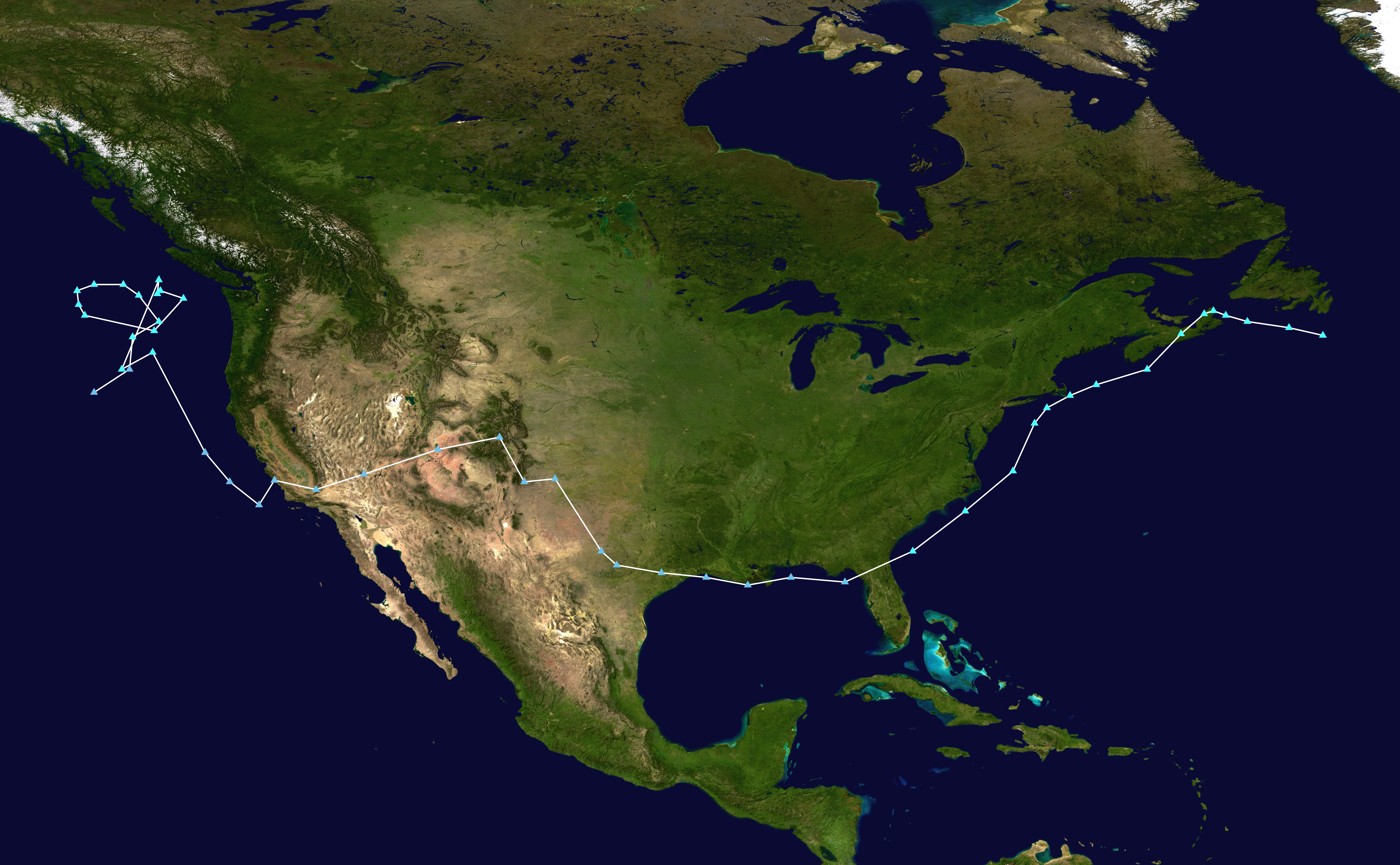
- Duration: December 24 – December 28, 2010
- Lowest pressure: 960 mb (28.35 inHg)
- Maximum snow: 36 in (91 cm)
- Fatalities: 7 fatalities
- Damage: $60 million (2010 USD)

This was a long-lived storm that primarily effected the Pacific Northwest and eastern regions of the US and Canada. The storm developed along the so-called Pineapple Express Atmospheric river as a disturbance in the Gulf of Alaska on December 5 and intensified as it began to move toward land. By the 8th it reached the coast of northwest North America but significantly weakened and a new storm formed in the Gulf of Alaska. By December 15 the storm had moved back toward the west coast and interacted with a kona low situated over Hawaii which feed the storm more energy through the Pineapple Express. The storm had undergone Explosive cyclogenesis on December 19, which caused flooding and mudslides in California. It would start to weaken as it move towards the Gulf of Mexico. It would dump snow on the mountains of Southern California and the 4 Corners region of the Country. When the storm reached Texas it absorbed Gulf Stream moisture and reintensified as it moved toward the Florida Panhandle on December 24. It transferred into a nor'easter as it moved up the east coast on December 27. It dumped snow on a portion of the Mid Atlantic and New England and was officially classified as a blizzard in New York City. North Carolina saw snowfall totals as high as 12 inches (30 cm). Philadelphia received 12.2 inches (31 cm) of snow and nearby Trenton, New Jersey saw upwards of 20 in (51 cm) snowfall totals. New York City and surrounding cities received anywhere from 12 inches (30 cm) to 32 inches (81 cm) of snow. Boston and coastal areas of Virginia saw only 12 inches (30 cm) of snow. Wind gusts reached 40–50 miles per hour (64–80 km/h) in certain areas, creating horrible driving conditions. The highest winds were recorded in Nova Scotia of 94.4 MPH (151.9 kp/h).

=== New Year's Eve tornado outbreak ===
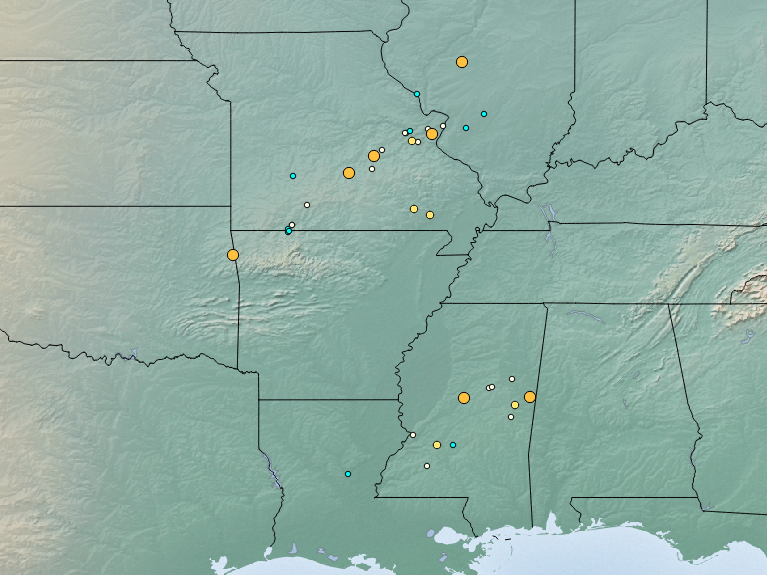
A map of the tornadoes that struck.

A tornado outbreak struck the southern United States in late December. The Storm Prediction Center has been calling for a significant severe weather event since December 25. However the predictability of the event was uncertain but, forecasts gained confidence as the event drew closer. On December 30 only marginally conductive conditions were present for a severe weather to form. Later on an approaching cold front induced supercells to form in the evening hours. The storm had spawned up to 5 EF3 tornadoes. The highest recorded non tornadic winds were 80 mph (130 km/h). On December 30, a few tornadoes were reported in portions of Arkansas. On the morning of December 31 there were several reports of tornadoes in Illinois and Missouri. In the afternoon and into the next day in Mississippi, a tornado in Jackson, Mississippi, prompted a tornado emergency to be issued.

=== Early January nor'easter ===
- Category 2 "Significant" (RSI/NOAA: 3.50)
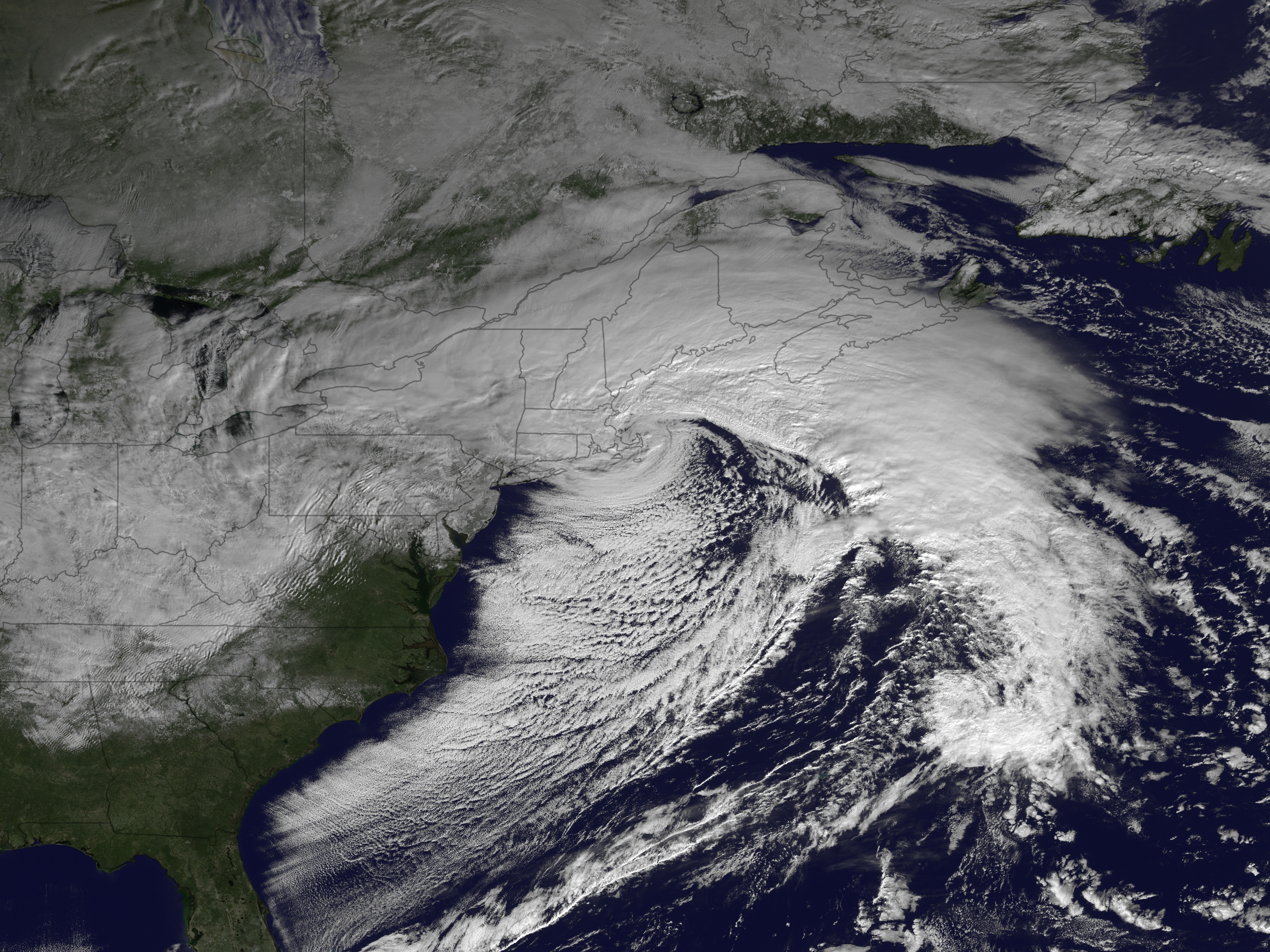
- Duration: January 8 – January 13, 2011
- Lowest pressure: 969 mb (28.61 inHg)
- Maximum snow: 40.5 in (103 cm)

In the middle of January, a storm formed in the Gulf of Mexico and interacted with cold air mass in Canada. This storm eventually merged with an Alberta clipper over Cape Hatteras. It tracked up the east coast as a nor'easter before moving out to sea. It brought winter weathering the form of snow and freezing rain from Texas to Atlantic Canada. It brought snowfall to areas that got hit hard by the previous blizzard. In New England there were reports of two feet of snow.

=== Late January nor'easter ===
- Category 1 "Notable" (RSI/NOAA: 2.65)
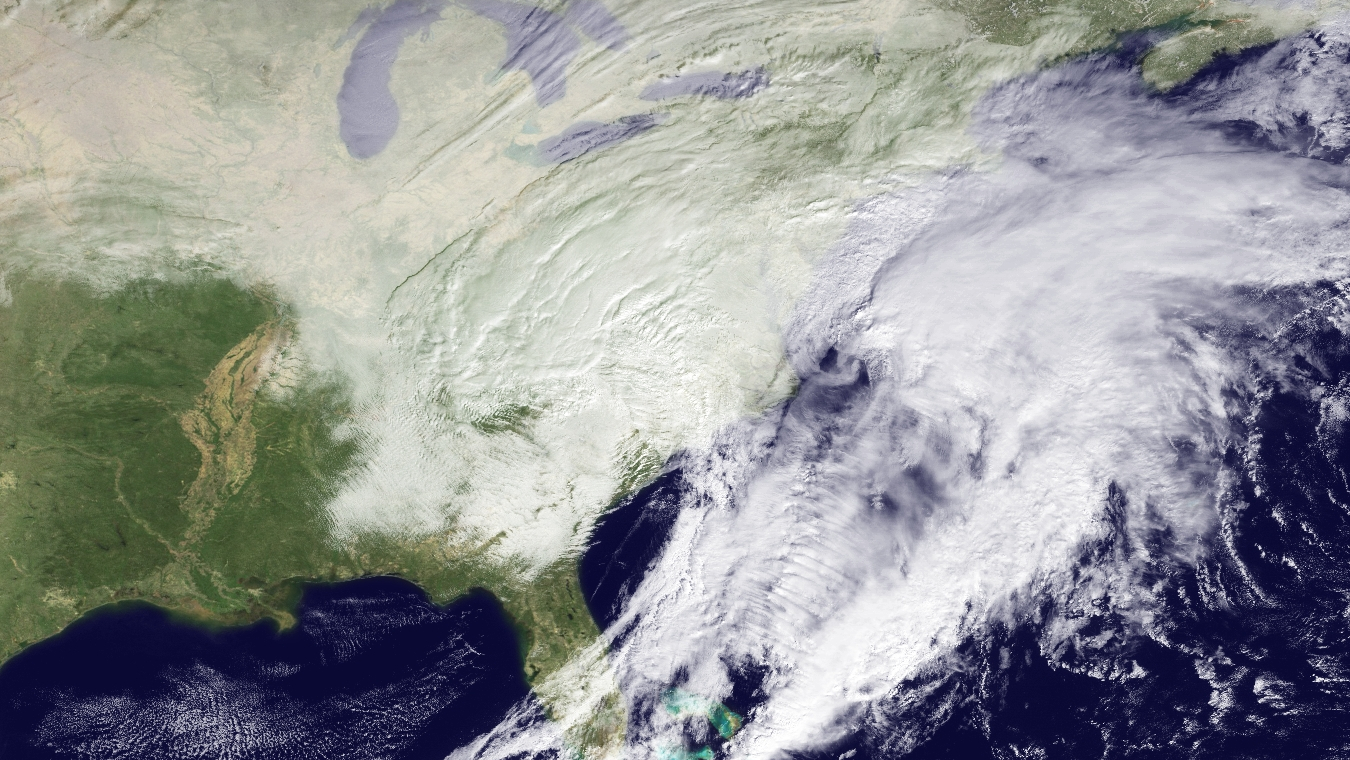
- Duration: January 24 – January 28, 2011
- Lowest pressure: 975 mb (28.79 inHg)
- Maximum snow: 40.5 in (103 cm)
- Fatalities: 2 fatalities

In late January, another major snowstorm hit the Northeast. It brought a winter storm to the mid Atlantic and a blizzard to New England. It hit two weeks after the previous nor'easter and one month after the December nor'easter, striking one week before the historic blizzard. The first part of this system hit the northeast as a coastal low with snow lasting from early January 26 to mid day of January 27. The second round of snow came when an upper-level low moved from eastern Tennessee to southern New England. This round had much steeper lapse rates than the first round and there were reports of thundersnow in some of the heavier bands. Areas with rain had gradually changed over to freezing rain then sleet.

=== Groundhog Day blizzard ===
- Category 5 "Extreme" (RSI/NOAA: 21.99)
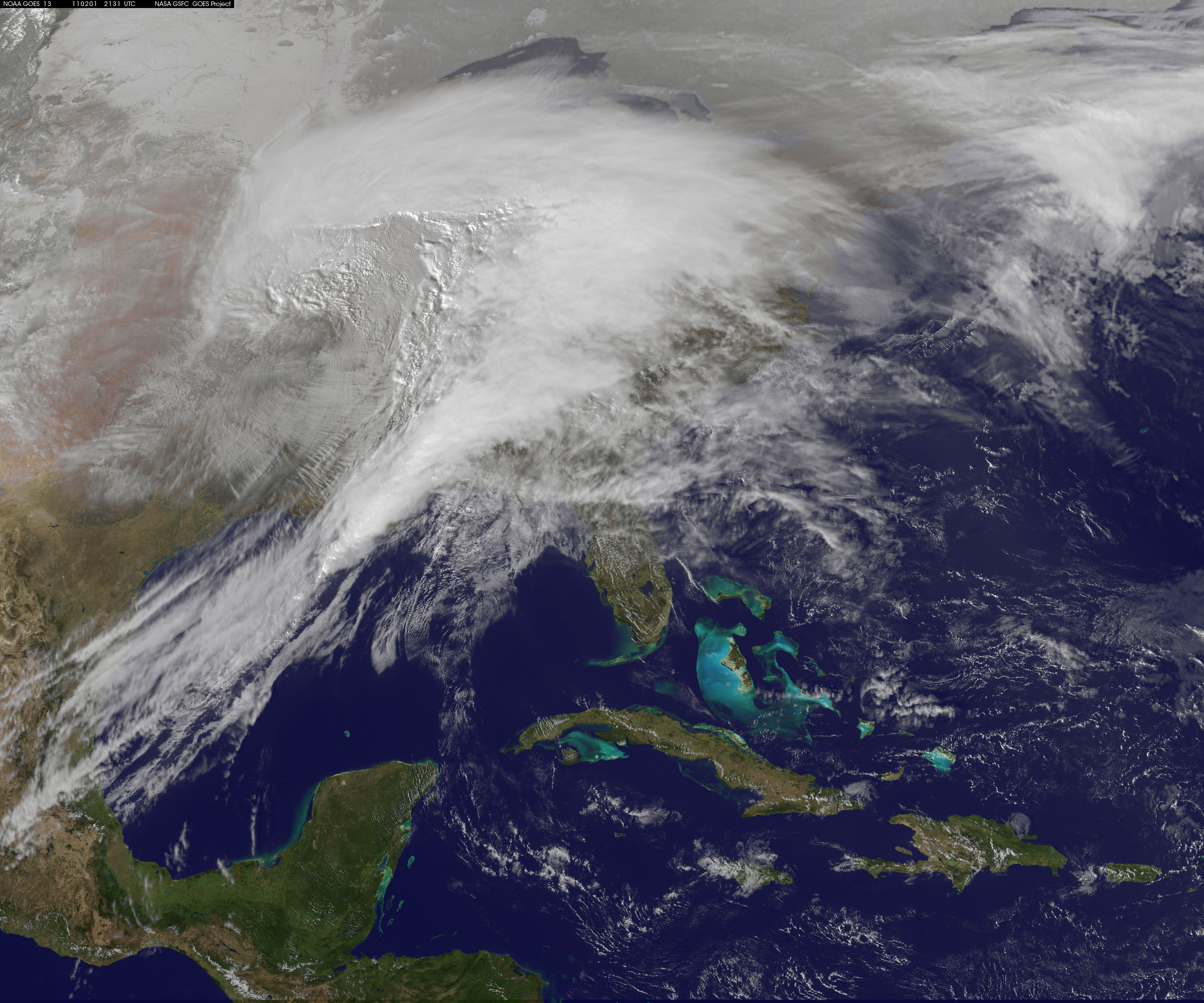
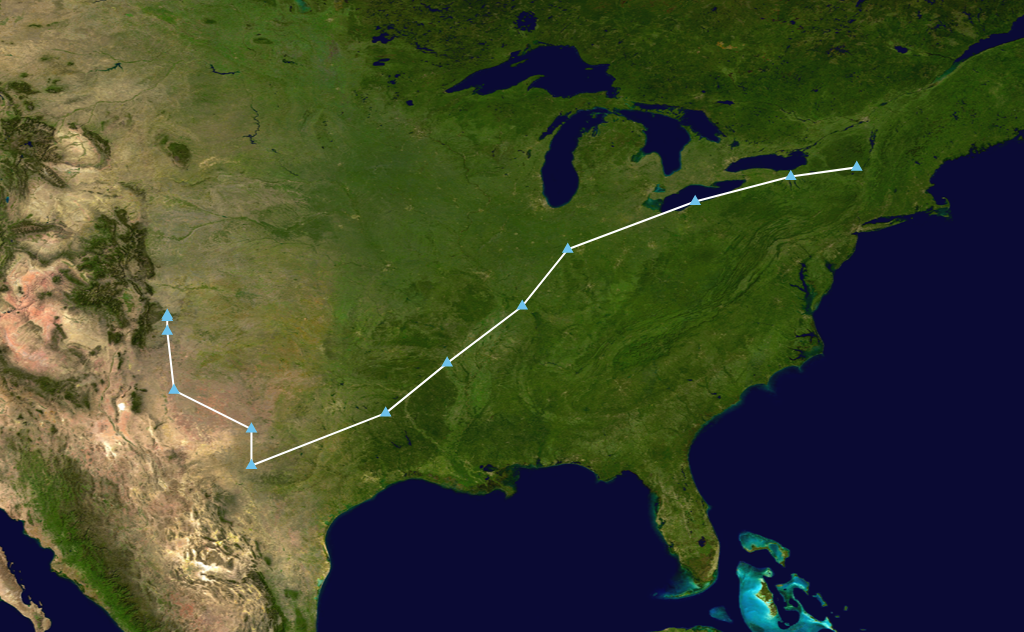
- Duration: January 31 – February 3, 2011
- Lowest pressure: 996 mb (29.41 inHg)
- Maximum snow: 27 in (69 cm)
- Fatalities: 36 fatalities
- Damage: $1.8 billion (2011 USD)

On January 31, a low-pressure system formed in Montana, and merged with a storm that pushed in from Northern California and a third storm in the Gulf of Mexico over the Midwest, on February 1, and rapidly intensified. The resulting storm brought a historic blizzard to the Midwest. It was the first storm to rank as a Category 5 on the RSI since 2009. It brought a tornado outbreak to the southeast states with most reported in Alabama. It brought a blizzard and winter storm from New Mexico to New England and later up into Atlantic Canada. Chicago received 1 to 2 feet of snow and 60 mph winds. The greater area of northern Illinois getting anywhere from 20 to 28 inches of snow. It hit the Midwest and New England with an ice storm along the warm front and mixed precipitation from New Mexico to Northern Texas. This ice storm brought 1 inch (2.5 cm) of ice to several areas.

=== Late January–early February cold wave ===
Following the major blizzard in the Midwest on Groundhog Day, a major cold wave behind the storm's cold front left temperatures plunging, with wind chill values dropped as low as −36 °F (−38 °C) in Boise City, the lowest recorded wind chill in the state since the deployment of the Oklahoma Mesonet. In Mexico, the temperatures dropped to −18 °C (0 °F) in the Ciudad Juárez metropolitan area in Mexico, and in the mountains area plunging to −23 °C (−9 °F), resulting in the deaths of at least six people in the coldest temperatures recorded in the area in at least half a century.

=== Mid-April storm complex ===
On April 14, a storm developed across the Midwest, bringing a tornado outbreak to much of the United States, and became the largest April tornado outbreak until the 2011 Super Outbreak, later in the month. In the southern part of the country, this tornado outbreak spawned 178 tornadoes, with the strongest category being an EF3. It was reported that the storm also produced large hail and straight-line winds. The system brought a late season snowstorm to the Midwest and Northern Plains, and blizzard conditions to parts of South Dakota and northern Nebraska. With surface temperatures near freezing the snow was unusually wet for the region. This led to bad driving conditions on Interstate 80 and Interstate 90.

== Records ==
=== United States ===
On February 10, 2011, Oklahoma set a statewide low temperature record, reaching a low temperature of −31 °F (−35 °C), in the town of Nowata.

=== Mexico ===
Temperatures dropped to −18 °C (0 °F) in the Ciudad Juárez metropolitan area in Mexico, and in the mountains area plunging to −23 °C (−9 °F), the coldest temperatures recorded in the area in at least half a century.

== Season effects ==
2010–11 North American winter season statistics
Event name	Dates active	RSI category	RSI value	Highest gust mph (km/h)	Minimum pressure (mbar)	Maximum snow in (cm)	Maximum ice in (mm)	Areas affected	Damage (2011 USD)	Deaths
Late October bomb cyclone	October 24 – 31	N/A	N/A	70 (112)	955.2	9 (22.5)	N/A	Midwest, Canadian Prairies	$18.5 million	1
November winter storm	November 13 – 15	Category 1	1.207	Unknown	Unknown	Unknown	Unknown	Upper Midwest	Unknown	Unknown
Mid December winter storm	December 11 – 14	Category 3	8.191	Unknown	Unknown	Unknown	Unknown	Midwest, Ohio Valley, Northeastern United States	Unknown	Unknown
Late December blizzard	December 24 – 28	Category 2	5.326	95 (153)	960	36 (91)	N/A	Western United States, Central United States, East Coast of the United States, Eastern Canada	$60 million	7
New Year's Eve tornado outbreak	December 29 – January 2	Category 2	5.926	80 (130)	Unknown	Unknown	Unknown	United States West Coast, Mountain states, Midwest, Southern United States	Unknown	None
Early January nor'easter	January 8 – 13	Category 2	4.157	unknown	969	40.5 (103)	N/A	Midwest, Southern United States, Mid-Atlantic States, New England, Eastern Canada	Unknown	None
Late January nor'easter	January 24 – 28	Category 1	2.643	unknown	975	26 (66)	N/A	Southern United States, Mid-Atlantic States, New England, Eastern Canada, Greenland	Unknown	2
Groundhog Day blizzard	January 31 – February 3	Category 5	21.990	70 (110)	996	27 (69)	1.0 (2.5)	Central United States, Southeastern United States, New England, Northeastern Mexico, Great Lakes, Eastern Canada, Greenland	$1.8 billion	≥36
Early February winter storm	February 8 – February 11	Category 4	11.798	Unknown	Unknown	Unknown	Unknown	Southern United States	Unknown	Unknown
Mid February winter storm	February 19 – February 23	Category 2	4.296	Unknown	Unknown	Unknown	Unknown	Northern Mountain states, Midwest	Unknown	Unknown
Late February winter storm	February 24 – February 27	Category 1	1.736	Unknown	Unknown	Unknown	Unknown	Midwest, Northeastern United States	Unknown	Unknown
Early March winter storm	March 4 – 7	N/A	N/A	Unknown	Unknown	Unknown	Unknown	Unknown	Unknown	Unknown
Mid March winter storm	March 9 – 12	N/A	N/A	Unknown	Unknown	Unknown	Unknown	Unknown	Unknown	Unknown
Late March winter storm	March 23 – 25	Category 1	2.350	Unknown	Unknown	Unknown	Unknown	Midwest, Northeastern United States	Unknown	Unknown
Mid-April storm complex	April 14 – 17	Category 1	1.827	70 (110)	984	16 (40)	0.3 (0.76)	Midwest	Unknown	None
Season aggregates
12 RSI storms	October 24 – April 17				955.2	40.5 (103)	1.0 (2.5)		≥ $1.88 billion	≥46

== See also ==
- Global storm activity of 2010

Preceded by 2009–10	North American winters 2010–11	Succeeded by 2011–12
