= 2010–2012 La Niña event =

Meteorological event in the Pacific Ocean

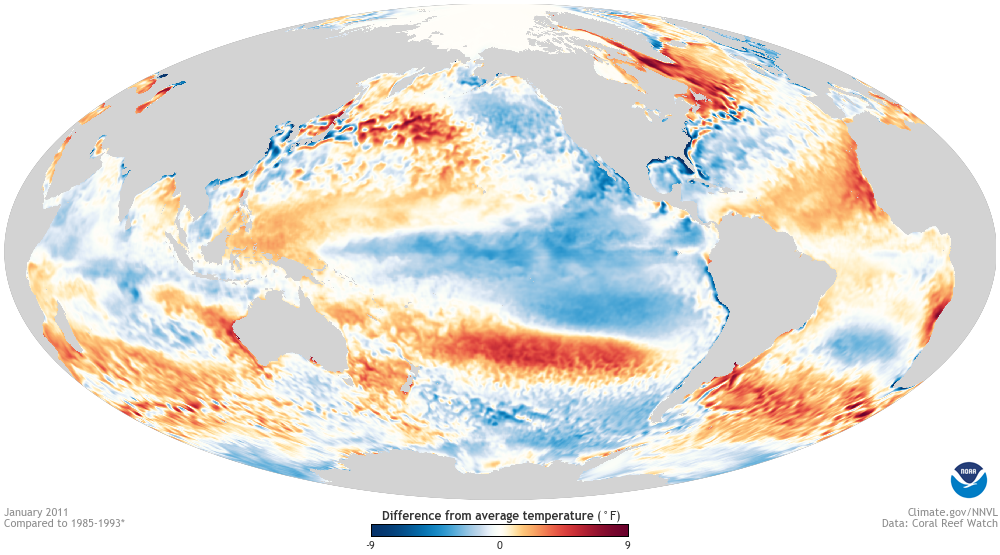
- Sea surface anomalies across the world in January 2011 during the 2010–2012 La Nina event.

Meteorological history
- Formed: June 2010 (Note: Each meteorological agency that monitors the state of the El Niño–Southern Oscillation, has a different definition of what constitutes an El Niño event tailored to their needs.)
- Dissipated: May 2012

Overall effects
- Damage: Significant
- Areas affected: The Pacific Ocean and surrounding areas

The 2010–2012 La Niña event was one of the strongest on record. It caused Australia to experience its wettest September on record in 2010, and its fourth-wettest year on record in 2010. It also led to an unusual intensification of the Leeuwin Current, the 2010 Pakistan floods, the 2010–2011 Queensland floods, and the 2011 East Africa drought. It also helped keep the average global temperature below recent trends, leading to 2011 tying with 1997 for the 14th-warmest year on record. This La Niña event also led to above-average tropical cyclone activity in the North Atlantic Ocean during the 2010, 2011, and 2012 hurricane seasons, while the Eastern and Western Pacific experienced record low activity in 2010 and below average activity in 2011.

== Meteorological progression ==
The 2009–2010 El Niño event started in the Pacific Ocean during July 2009, before it reached it peaked during December and broke down during the first quarter of 2010. The climate of the Pacific Ocean subsequently returned to neutral conditions by the end of April, while climate models used and developed by various meteorological agencies, subsequently started to show signs that a La Niña event would develop later in 2010. Over the next month the Pacific Ocean started to show various signals that indicated a La Niña event was developing and as a result, a La Niña watch was issued by the United States Climate Prediction Center during their June 2010 ENSO diagnostic discussion. As the ocean's surface temperature cooling progressed, more colder anomalies appeared at the International Date Line rather than over eastern Pacific, what allowed calling this event as a Modoki one.

== Impacts ==
Australia experienced its second- and third-wettest years, since a record of the rainfall started to kept during 1900. Winter saw above average snowfall in much of the Western United States as well as the Midwest. With the exception of the Southern Rockies, Western Mountains saw snowpack totals above 180% of normal. Meanwhile, the 2011 Groundhog Day blizzard caused record snowfall in Chicago and forced the city to shutdown. Because this was a La Niña, it brought California the wettest December on record and the summer of 2011 was California's wettest. The Pacific Northwest saw 2011 being one of the coolest, wettest years on record, with temperatures still in the 50s and rain/snow mix even in May. The Midwest and Northeastern United States also experienced an extremely wet 2011, leading to flooding across the Mississippi River, Missouri River, and the Ohio River. The La Nina is also blamed for the record tornado activity across the Southern U.S during Spring 2011, especially the Super Outbreak, which is the largest and costliest tornado outbreak in recorded history, as well as being one of the most violent and one of the deadliest. The 2010–2013 Southern United States and Mexico drought caused low streamflow, agricultural distress, and wildfires throughout the Southern Plains and Georgia. The worst effects were felt in Texas, where 2011 was the driest calendar year on record as well as the third warmest.
