= Carmageddon (disambiguation) =

Carmageddon is the first game in the vehicular combat video game series, developed by Stainless Games.

Carmageddon may also refer to:

== Carmageddon series ==
- Carmageddon II: Carpocalypse Now, the second installment, developed by Stainless Games
- Carmageddon TDR 2000, the third entry, developed by Torus Games
- Carmageddon: Reincarnation (Max Damage), the fourth title, developed by Stainless Games
- Carmageddon: Rogue Shift, the fifth title, developed by 34BigThings

== Other uses ==
- Carmageddon (freeway), nickname for a 2011 closure of I‑405 in Los Angeles
- Carmageddon, the severe traffic delays that occurred during the January 25–27, 2011 nor'easter

== See also ==
- Karmageddon (disambiguation)
