= January 25–27, 2011 nor'easter =

Weather event in North America

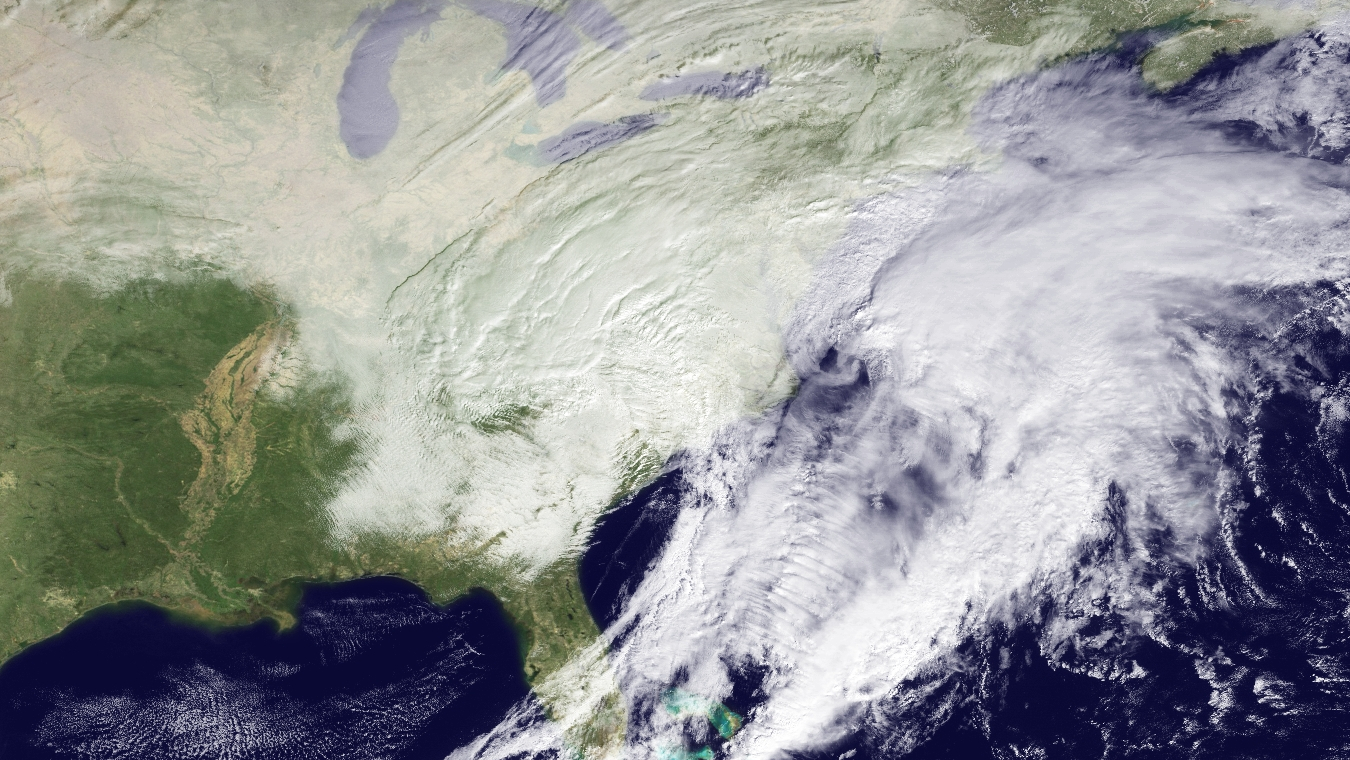
- The cyclone on January 26, 2011

Meteorological history
- Formed: January 24, 2011
- Dissipated: February 3, 2011

Category 1 "Notable" winter storm
- Regional snowfall index: 2.65 (NOAA)

Overall effects
- Fatalities: 2
- Areas affected: Southern United States, Mid-Atlantic Region, New England, eastern Canada, Southern Greenland, Europe
- Part of the 2010-11 North American winter

The January 25–27, 2011 nor'easter was a major Mid-Atlantic nor'easter that affected portions of the northeastern United States and Canada. This storm came just two weeks after a previous major nor'easter had already affected most of these same areas earlier on the same month of January 2011. The storm also came just one month after a previous major blizzard that affected the entire area after Christmas in December 2010. This storm was the third significant snowstorm to affect the region during the 2010–11 North American winter storm season. It was followed a few days later by another massive storm that blanketed much of the United States and Canada.

== Impact ==
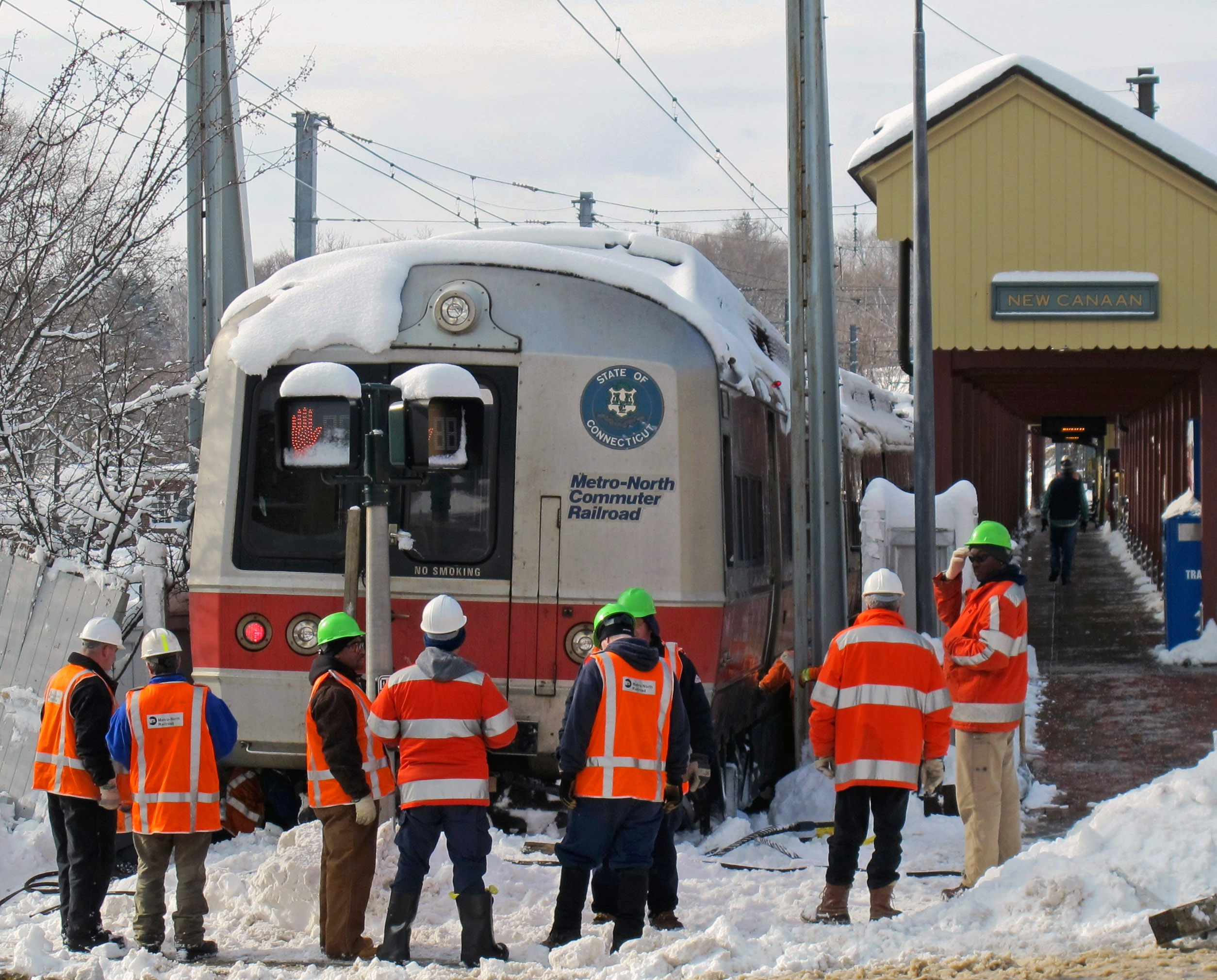
Derailed commuter train in New Canaan, Connecticut, after storm

=== New Jersey ===
Near 20 inches were reported on the ground at Newark, New Jersey by January 27, where snowfall rates were at 3 to 4 inches an hour. Portions of Southern New Jersey saw variable snow amounts. Atlantic City saw about 3 inches of snow and Cape May reported about 2.5". All across the central portion of the state from Westfield Township to Freehold reported snowfall amounts in the ranges of 21–26 inches.

=== Connecticut ===
There were multiple reports of 18–19 inches across the state. During the Blizzard there were snowfall rates of up to 4 inches per hour. Within the first 2 hours of the storm, Meriden recorded 7.5 inches on the ground. The NWS forecasted 5–9 inches Thursday evening. Once the snow ended in the morning it was clear that forecast was underestimated. The higher amounts were in the southern and eastern portions of the state, with the least in the northwestern corner.

=== New York ===
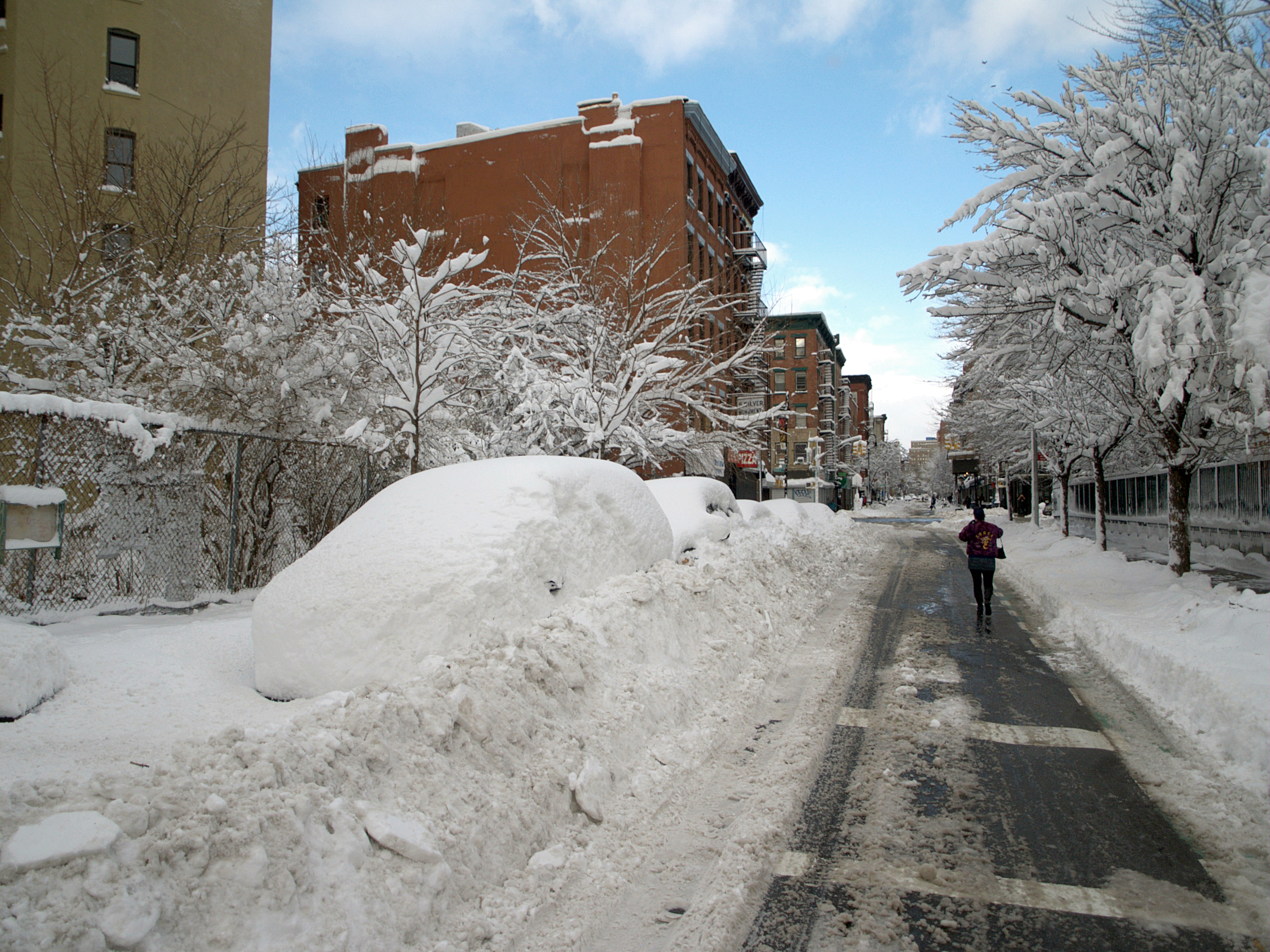
The effects of the blizzard on Manhattan's Lower East Side.

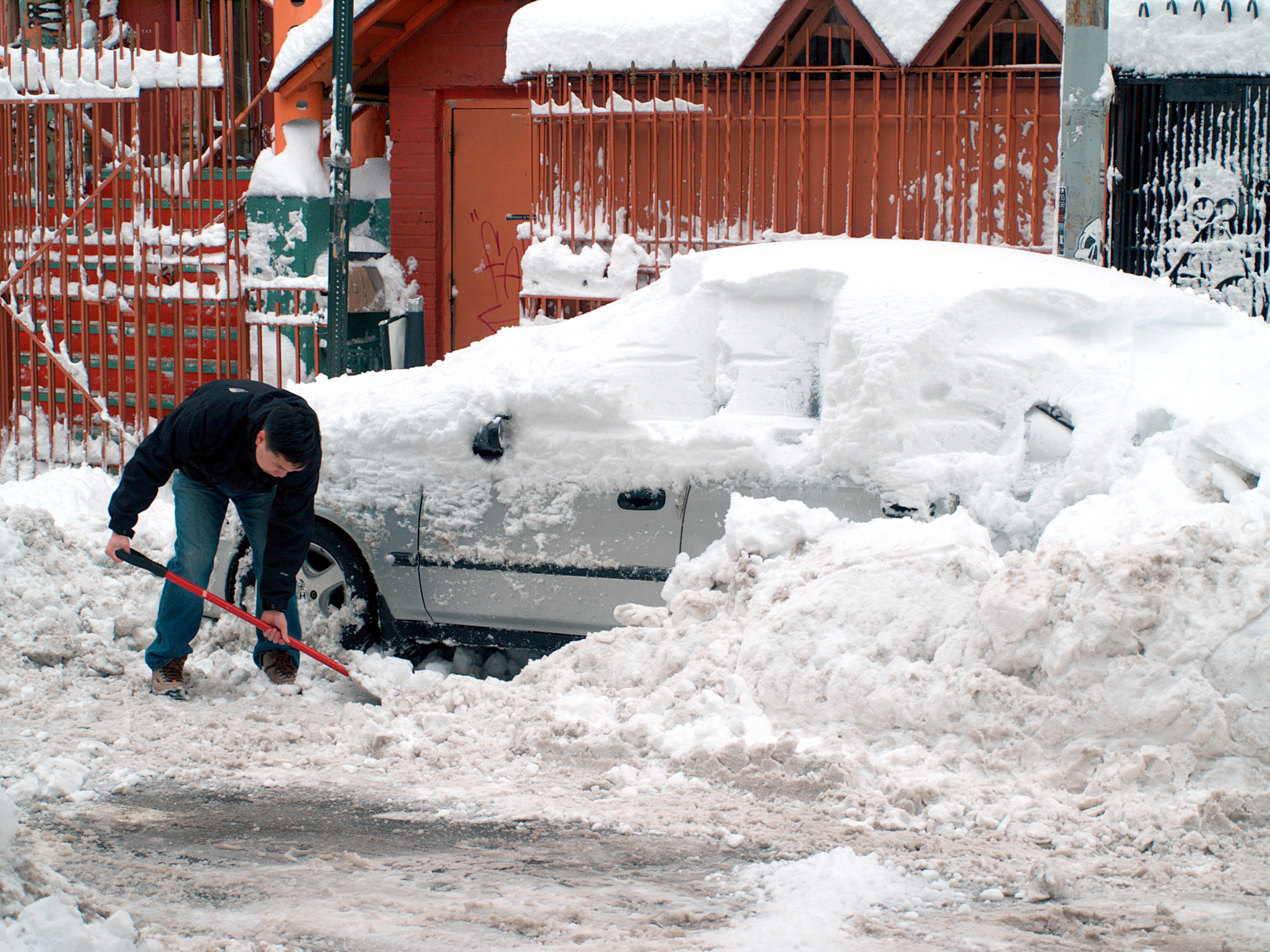
Citizen begins digging their vehicle out of the snow in the aftermath of the blizzard on the Lower East Side

At least 19 inches of snow accumulated in New York City in the wake of the storm. As a result, for the ninth time in the city's history, all public schools were closed. All area airports were also closed. Airports re-opened later in the afternoon of January 27. All non-emergency city government offices were closed as well. After the additional snowfall, this made January 2011 the snowiest January on record for New York City. The storm also caused two deaths. A 64-year-old woman was struck and killed by a snow plow on January 25. New York Mayor Michael Bloomberg declared a citywide weather emergency early on the 25th, which resulted in the closing of schools and government buildings as well as temporary closures of all of the area's Airports. After this storm, January 2011 became the snowiest January in New York City.

=== Pennsylvania ===
Philadelphia received almost 15 inches of snow after the storm ended. The one-two punch hit the local Philadelphia area the hardest. Many municipalities declared snow emergencies.

There were more than three dozen accidents during the morning of the 26th. This included an ambulance on its way to a hospital with a patient in West Nantmeal Township (Chester County). No injuries were reported. SEPTA regional transportation reported service disruptions along with systemwide delays. Philadelphia International Airport had 41 morning flights cancelled and had average delays of three hours. With the first surge of snow on the morning of the 26th, many school districts made last minute decisions to either close or have delayed openings. Many closed early that afternoon. Even Saint Joseph's University and West Chester University closed. Conditions though became worse when the second punch of heavier snow came through on the evening of the 26th. Snowfall rates reached 2 to 4 inches per hour. In Philadelphia, the emergency 311 hot line had four times the normal rate of calls. Many vehicles and buses were stuck in the snow. Some SEPTA bus drivers were stranded up to twelve hours. SEPTA still had service suspended on about one third of its routes on the 28th.

About 1,500 travelers were stranded overnight on the 26th at Philadelphia International Airport. Schools and courts were closed on the 27th. Schools were also closed on the 28th. In the northwest suburbs, numerous crashes were reported in Berks, Chester and Montgomery Counties on Pennsylvania State Routes 100 and 29 as well as U.S. Routes 202 and 422. In West Pottsgrove (Montgomery County), a 45-year-old man was injured after his vehicle slid down an embankment on Westbound U.S. Route 422 and rolled over. In Northampton County, westbound Interstate 78 was closed for three hours overnight on the 26th between Pennsylvania State Routes 412 and 309 because of disabled commercial vehicles. The weight of the snow also downed some trees in the southeast part of the state, but power outages remained isolated. The continued onslaught of winter weather was causing numerous municipalities to exhaust their snow removal budgets. The city of Philadelphia estimated the clean-up costs from the latest winter storm was at least 6 million dollars.

Residents throughout the Philadelphia area reported thundersnow, a rare meteorological phenomenon in which thunder and lightning occur concurrently with the falling snow. Chester County received over 20 inches of snow. In Berks County most residents received around 13–14 inches of snow.

=== Washington, D.C. ===
Washington D.C. received 5 to 10 inches of heavy, wet snow. As many as 650,000 people lost power as a result of the blizzard. Commutes across the region were difficult the afternoon of the storm, with many people spending four to eight hours in traffic on the way home; some, on the George Washington Memorial Parkway, were stuck for up to fourteen hours, and many abandoned their vehicles on the roadway.

A 77-year-old pedestrian in Pasadena, Maryland was killed when he was struck by a snow plow.

== See also ==
- January 8–13, 2011 North American blizzard
- December 2010 North American blizzard
