= January 8–13, 2011 nor'easter =

Weather event in the United States

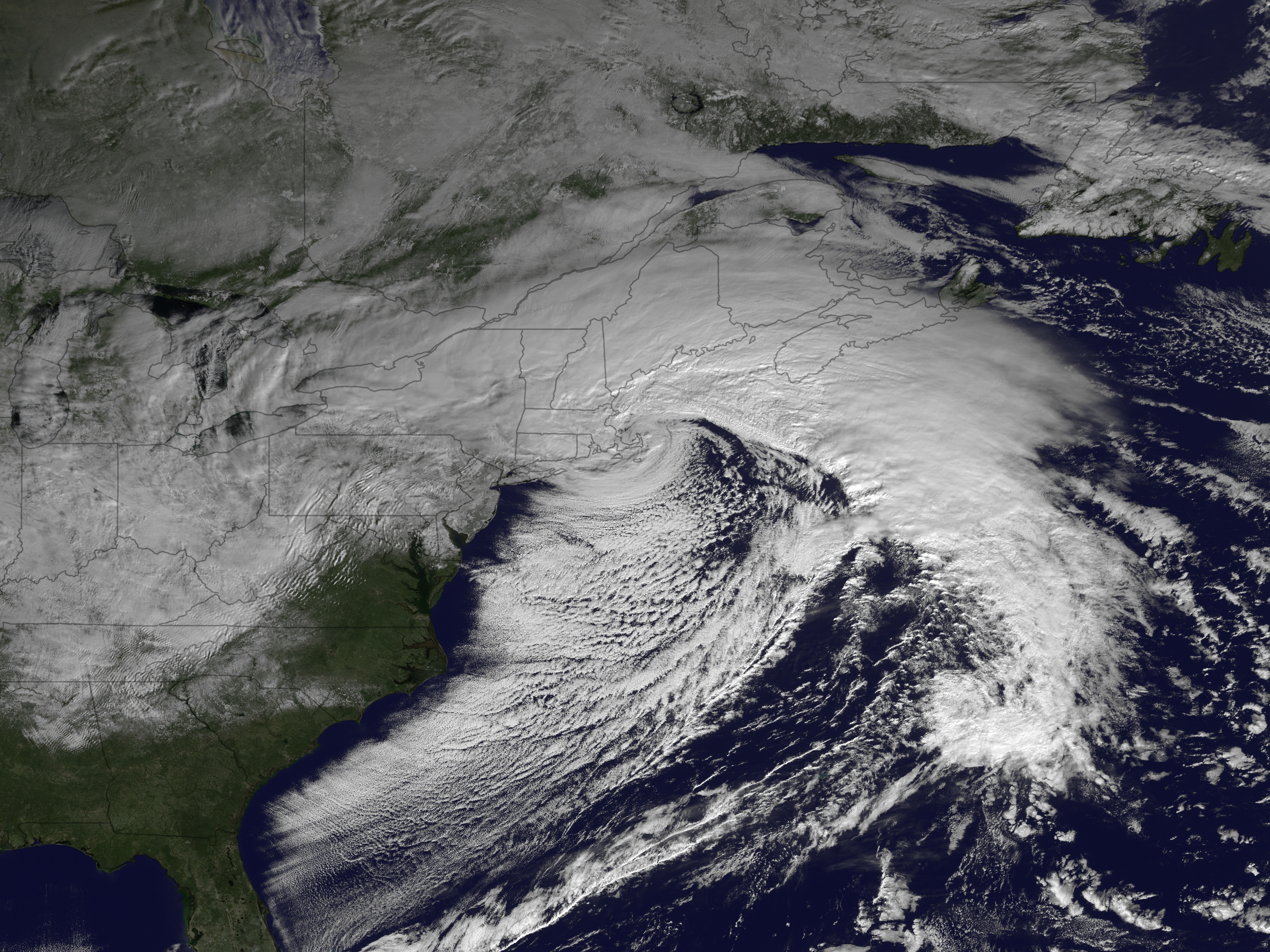
- Satellite image of the storm as it passed over Cape Cod on January 12, 2011.

Meteorological history
- Formed: January 8, 2011
- Dissipated: January 13, 2011 (Exited to sea)

Category 2 "Minor" winter storm
- Regional snowfall index: 3.50 (NOAA)
- Maximum snowfall or ice accretion: 40.5 inches (103 cm) at Savoy, Massachusetts

Overall effects
- Areas affected: Midwestern United States, Southern United States, Mid-Atlantic Region, New England, eastern Canada
- Part of the 2010–11 North American winter

The January 8–13, 2011 nor'easter was a major Mid-Atlantic nor'easter that affected portions of the Northeastern and Southeastern regions of the United States. This storm came just two weeks after a previous major blizzard severely affected most of these same areas in December 2010. It was the second significant snowstorm to affect the region during the 2010–11 North American winter storm season.

== Meteorological history ==
The storm took on a similar track as the storm that had crippled the region in December 2010. The storm formed as a low pressure system in the Gulf of Mexico, which interacted with an upper-level low pressure system that dropped down from central Canada. Like the previous storm, it was fueled by a great amount of southern stream energy. In mid-Atlantic states, the track of the storm was over 50 miles east of the previous one; besides, the storm was a fast-moving system. As a result, snowfall totals in these areas were not expected to reach those of the December 2010 blizzard two weeks earlier. However, the storm dumped over 2 feet of snow in some areas in New England before it moved out to sea on Thursday.

== Impact ==
From January 8 through January 10, the storm dropped a swath of snow and ice from eastern Texas, and eastward across portions of Arkansas, Louisiana, Mississippi, Alabama, Tennessee, Georgia, and the Carolinas. Significant snows and ice fell in these regions causing significant travel emergencies and accidents. Hartsfield-Jackson Atlanta International Airport, the busiest in the world had only seen around 30 flights take off. Many flights were canceled however the airport did not close. Icy conditions were reported around the Atlanta and Birmingham as numerous traffic accidents were reported. An Atlanta Hawks game was postponed due to the ice.

Meanwhile, a second system swung southeastward from Alberta, Canada, delivering light amounts of snow to the Dakotas, the Upper Midwest and the Great Lakes regions. Energy from the two systems combined off the coast of Cape Hatteras, North Carolina, late on January 10, forming the storm that delivered over 2 feet of snow to New England on January 12.

The storm affected portions of New Jersey, New York, much of Connecticut, Rhode Island, and Massachusetts overnight late Tuesday into Wednesday, January 12, 2011. Although the storm was expected to intensify to become a blizzard, New York City was spared from the worst. The city's public schools remained open. By Wednesday morning, Central Park had received 9.1 inches of snow; however, a lot of the areas in central and eastern Long Island had seen 15 to 20 inches of snow before it all ended. In Edison, New Jersey, there was a reported snowfall total of 10.2 inches of snow.

Connecticut bore the brunt of the storm, with many locations checking in with snowfall totals of 20 to 30 inches. Heavy snow caused the roof of an apartment building in Norwich to collapse, forcing the evacuation of 10 residents. The storm forced state troopers to close a 50-mile stretch of Interstate 95 in southwest Connecticut due to numerous trucks becoming stuck on the highway in the snow. The storm also caused the bubble covering the Cheshire Community Pool in Cheshire, Connecticut, to collapse, forcing its closure for the season.

The highest amount of snowfall was reported at Savoy, Massachusetts, with 40.5 inches. The storm also caused widespread airport delays and school closings in the region. Also, isolated amounts of more than 2 feet occurred in eastern Massachusetts. In Wilmington, MA, Winchester, MA and Lexington, MA, amounts of 24 inches occurred, with Winchester reporting 24.2 inches.

The Edgewood Yacht Club was completely destroyed by a fire at the height of the storm. The elements made it extremely difficult for the fire to be put out. There were no injuries from the fire, although it is still unknown what caused the fire to start.

This storm together with others later in the month is estimated to have led to a loss of 150,000 jobs in the United States for January.

== See also ==
- December 2010 North American blizzard
