= Karmageddon (song) =

2024 single by Iyah May

Single by Iyah May
- Released: 13 November 2024
- Genre: Alternative pop; Indie pop
- Length: 3:26
- Label: Self-released
- Songwriters: Danny Duke; Iyah May
- Producer: Danny Duke

Music video
- "Karmageddon" on YouTube

"Karmageddon" is a single recorded by Australian singer-songwriter Iyah May.

== Critical reception ==
As a result of the song going viral on social media after political activist Ryan Fournier shared the single on Twitter, Newsweek branded May "the new darling of the political right".

== Credits and personnel ==
- Iyah May – vocals, songwriter
- Danny Duke – songwriter, arranger, producer

== Charts ==
Weekly chart performance for "Karmageddon"
Chart (2024–2025)	Peak position
UK Singles Sales (OCC)	44
