= List of North American blizzards of 2010 =

North American blizzard of 2010 may refer to any of six blizzards that took place in 2010:

- January 2010 North American winter storms on January 16–28, 2010.
- February 5–6, 2010 North American blizzard on February 5–6, 2010.
- February 9–10, 2010 North American blizzard on February 9–10, 2010.
- February 25–27, 2010 North American blizzard on February 25–27, 2010.
- March 2010 nor'easter on March 12–16, 2010.
- December 2010 North American blizzard on December 13–29, 2010.
