= Brewmeister Brewery =

Brewery in Keith, Moray, Scotland

Keith Brewery LTD is a Scottish brewery based in Keith, Moray, formerly known as Brewmeister. It was founded in 2012, and has subsequently grown to export worldwide.

== Company history ==
The brewery began life on a farm in Royal Deeside, Aberdeenshire with a student loan. The first beer produced was Armageddon, which the company claimed in press releases was the world's strongest beer at 65% alcohol by volume (ABV). Some batches of the beer were incorrectly manufactured to a strength of 15.2% ABV.

In 2013, Brewmeister replaced Armageddon with a stronger beer called Snake Venom claiming 67.5% ABV, and put a warning label on the bottle advising consumers to only drink one 35ml measure per sitting. It retailed at £50 for a 275ml bottle. Brewmeister claimed that the beer "tastes like a liquor and has a whole host of different flavours, ranging from bubblegum to caramel." However, Guinness Book of Records still consider the strongest beer ever sold the Brewdog's "The End of History" with 55% ABV.

In March 2014, the company announced they would move to new facilities at the Isla Bank Mills in Keith and quadruple beer production while in May of the same year, the company won the BQ Scottish Business Award for Export. Richard Lochhead, Member of the Scottish Parliament for Keith, said that the move would be "a successful addition to Moray's strong food and drinks sector." The brewery currently employs 13 people.

== Production ==
The strength of the beer comes from fractional freezing, which involves cooling the beer to a low temperature to the point where water freezes but alcohol does not. The ice is then removed, leaving a higher percentage of alcohol behind. The company claims to use natural spring water for brewing and claims to use unusual ingredients in their beers. In 2014, they announced that 90% of their product was being exported.

== Controversy ==
In 2014 the Advertising Standards Agency censured Brewmeister for misleading advertising, stating that it was possibly ethyl alcohol that had been added to Snake Venom to reach the desired ABV of 67.5%.

== Investment ==
In 2014, Brewmeister re-launched following the formation of a Board of Directors which came about after Brewmeister was partially bought by a syndicate of Scottish business figures. This included Scott Carnegie, a former Chairman of Dundee United Football Club. Brewmeister also received investment from Highlands and Islands Enterprise, Scottish Enterprise and the Scottish Investment Bank. Scottish Enterprise are also holders of shares in the company.

== Competition ==
Since 2021, 88 Brewery, another Scottish brewery, has brewed a beer by the name of "Scottish Beithir Fire" that is 75% ABV, surpassing Snake Venom's 67.5% ABV.
