= Armageddon (underground comic) =

Science fiction series created by Barney Steel

- Armageddon #1, 1972, artwork by Barney Steel.

Publication information
- Publisher: Last Gasp
- Format: Ongoing series
- Publication date: 1972–1974
- No. of issues: 3

Creative team
- Created by: Barney Steel

Armageddon is a 1972–1974 underground comic title published by Last Gasp. Written and illustrated by Barney Steel, the comic expressed an anarcho-capitalist philosophy, influenced by Ayn Rand, and explored sociopolitical themes.

== Publication history ==
The first issue of Armageddon appeared as an issue of All-New Underground Comix. It is the only comic book from that series to continue onto its own series. Armageddon ran for three issues.

== Themes ==
Armageddon #2 included a story which explored racism from an individualist perspective. The story focused on an African-American gold miner and a Caucasian logger who marry spouses of the opposite race (the gold miner marries a white woman and the logger marries a black woman), form a business partnership, then participate in a sex orgy. Steel depicted white and black communities as equally racist, and expressed the view that in order to end racism, people should forget race and drop out of society to return to an economy based on gold and bartering. Steel's political views were anarcho-capitalist, with his philosophy taking inspiration from the writing of author/philosopher Ayn Rand. The satire of Steel's work was occasionally controversial, such as in the first issue, which depicted civil rights leader Martin Luther King Jr. sodomizing segregationist George Wallace.

== Reception ==
Steel's comic books were regarded within underground comix circles as being right-wing. M. Steven Fox, in contrast, writing for Comixjoint, feels that Steel's influences from Objectivism makes him closer to Robert Crumb than right-wing pundits like Rush Limbaugh. Leonard Rifas, writing in Multicultural Comics: From Zap to Blue Beetle, calls Steel's dialogue "wooden". Frank R. Wallace describes the comic as being "philosophically flawed".
