= December 2010 North American blizzard =

Blizzard in 2010 that affected the Northeastern United States

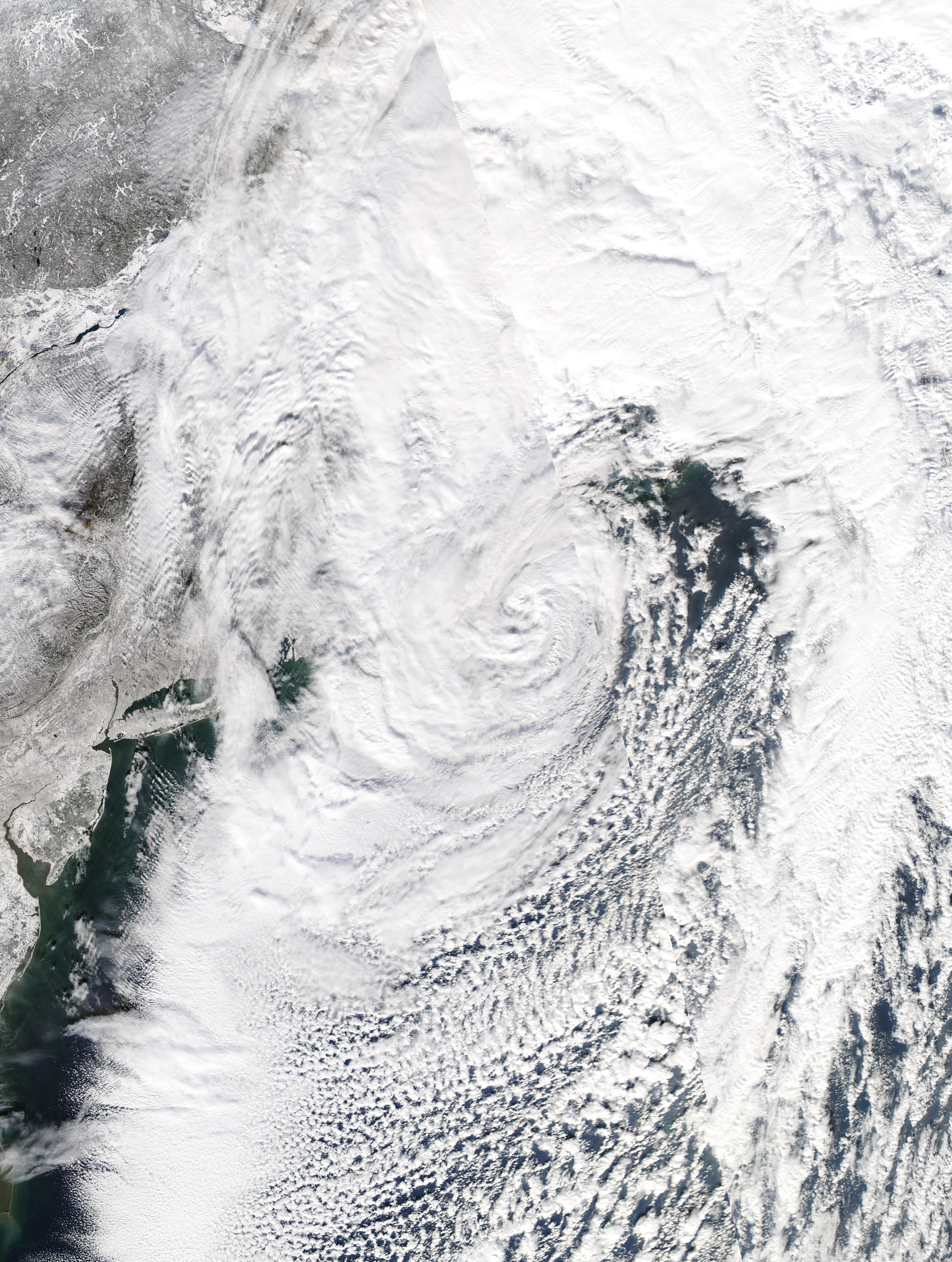
- Visible satellite imagery of the nor'easter from the Aqua satellite offshore Cape Cod near peak intensity, during the afternoon of December 27.

Meteorological history
- Formed: December 24, 2010
- Exited land: December 28, 2010
- Dissipated: December 30, 2010

Category 2 "Minor" blizzard
- Regional snowfall index: 3.27 (NOAA)
- Highest winds: 65 mph (100 km/h) (1-minute sustained winds)
- Highest gusts: 95 mph (153 km/h) in Scituate, Massachusetts
- Lowest pressure: 960 mbar (hPa); 28.35 inHg
- Max. snowfall: 36 inches (91 cm) at Brick, New Jersey

Overall effects
- Fatalities: 7 total
- Damage: $60 million (2010 USD)
- Areas affected: Western United States, Central United States, East Coast of the United States, Eastern Canada, Bermuda
- Part of the 2010–11 North American winter

From December 26–28, 2010, a historic and severe blizzard, known commonly as the Blizzard of 2010 or the Boxing Day Blizzard, affected the Northeastern United States with coastal flooding and heavy snowfall of up to 2–3 feet (24–36 in) just after Christmas Day. It was the first significant winter storm of the 2010–11 North American winter storm season and the fifth North American blizzard of 2010. The blizzard affected the northeast megalopolis, which includes major cities such as Norfolk, Pittsburgh, Philadelphia, Newark, New York City, Hartford, Providence, and Boston. In some locations, it was the heaviest since the January 1996 blizzard.

The storm had many similarities to the North American blizzard of 2006. The storm also generated a rare meteorological phenomenon known as thundersnow in which thunder and lightning occur concurrently with the falling snow. Several synoptic factors contributed to the intensity of this blizzard. At least 7 people were confirmed to have died from the blizzard, and damages are estimated to be around US$60 million.

== Meteorological history ==
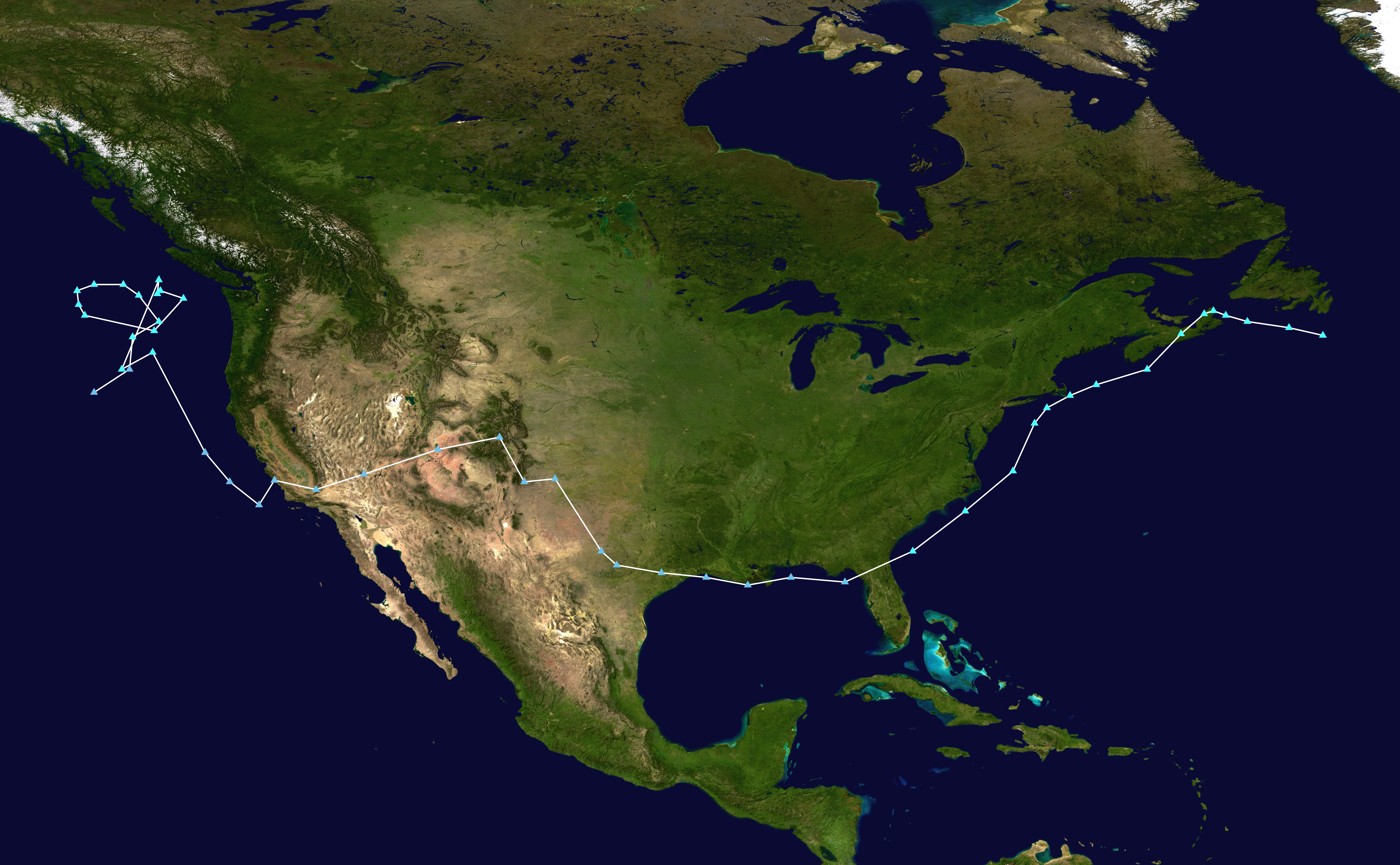
Map plotting the storm's track and intensity, according to the Saffir–Simpson scale Map key Saffir–Simpson scale Tropical depression (≤38 mph, ≤62 km/h) Tropical storm (39–73 mph, 63–118 km/h) Category 1 (74–95 mph, 119–153 km/h) Category 2 (96–110 mph, 154–177 km/h) Category 3 (111–129 mph, 178–208 km/h) Category 4 (130–156 mph, 209–251 km/h) Category 5 (≥157 mph, ≥252 km/h) Unknown Storm type Tropical cyclone Subtropical cyclone Extratropical cyclone, remnant low, tropical disturbance, or monsoon depression

On December 25, a shortwave trough moved eastwards into the western Gulf of Mexico, generating a weak area of low pressure in its vicinity along the Texas coastline. Shortly afterward, the Hydrometeorological Prediction Center (HPC) began issuing storm summary bulletins on the developing storm. The system continued eastwards towards the state of Florida, as another shortwave trough from Canada moved southeastwards, causing light-to-moderate snowfall to occur across the Midwestern United States and Ohio Valley. Later that night, as both disturbances gravitated towards each other and coalesced into one larger system, the winter storm crossed Florida emerging into the southwestern Atlantic, and began strengthening into the early morning hours of December 26 as it began moving northeastwards, becoming a nor'easter in the process.

Widespread snowfall, some heavy, was now occurring north to south from South Carolina to southern Maryland. Rapid strengthening ensued later that morning as the nor'easter moved nearly due north, as winds and snowfall spread into and increased along the Mid-Atlantic states. Blizzard conditions occurred as the day progressed into evening along the coastlines of states like New Jersey, and mesoscale features associated with a powerful jet caused heavy snowbands to develop and pivot towards the coastline, with rates of 2–4 inches (5.1–10.2 cm) per hour occurring across eastern New Jersey during the evening hours; thundersnow was reported in New York City around this time. Early on December 27, as the forward speed of the system slowed, the blizzard reached its peak intensity of 961 mb (28.4 inHg) near Cape Cod, equal in pressure to that found in a Category 3 hurricane. The system gradually turned eastwards as snowfall slowly began tapering off west to east, before exiting on December 28. The low eventually weakened south of Atlantic Canada before dissipating as it was absorbed into a new storm on December 30.

=== Forecasting difficulties ===
The storm was difficult to predict due to disagreements between models; it wasn't until about two days prior on December 24 when the most models anticipated a major snowstorm. The National Weather Service's HPC and many other private forecasters were skeptical of the storm impacting the Northeastern states until about 24 hours of the storm's arrival as well; although, some models depicted the storm delivering a full-blown blizzard to the New York City metropolitan area as early as a week in advance. The Hydrometeorological Prediction Center even issued a statement on Christmas Eve, 48 hours prior to the storm, that they suspected the American models of having model initialization errors; thus, they believed these errors may have forced the storm to be erroneously modeled to come up the Northeastern coast.

== Preparations and impact ==
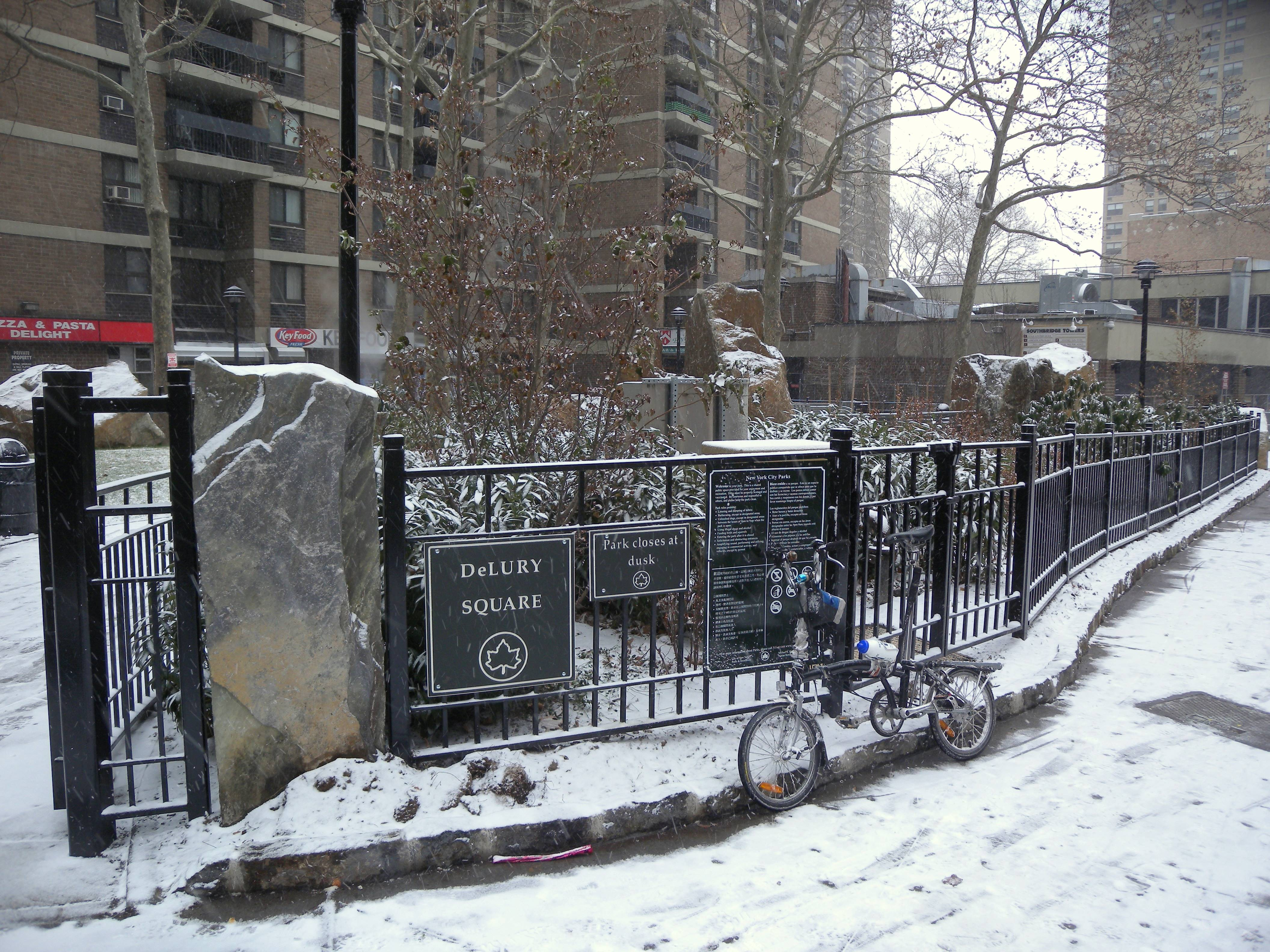
Manhattan as snowfall begins

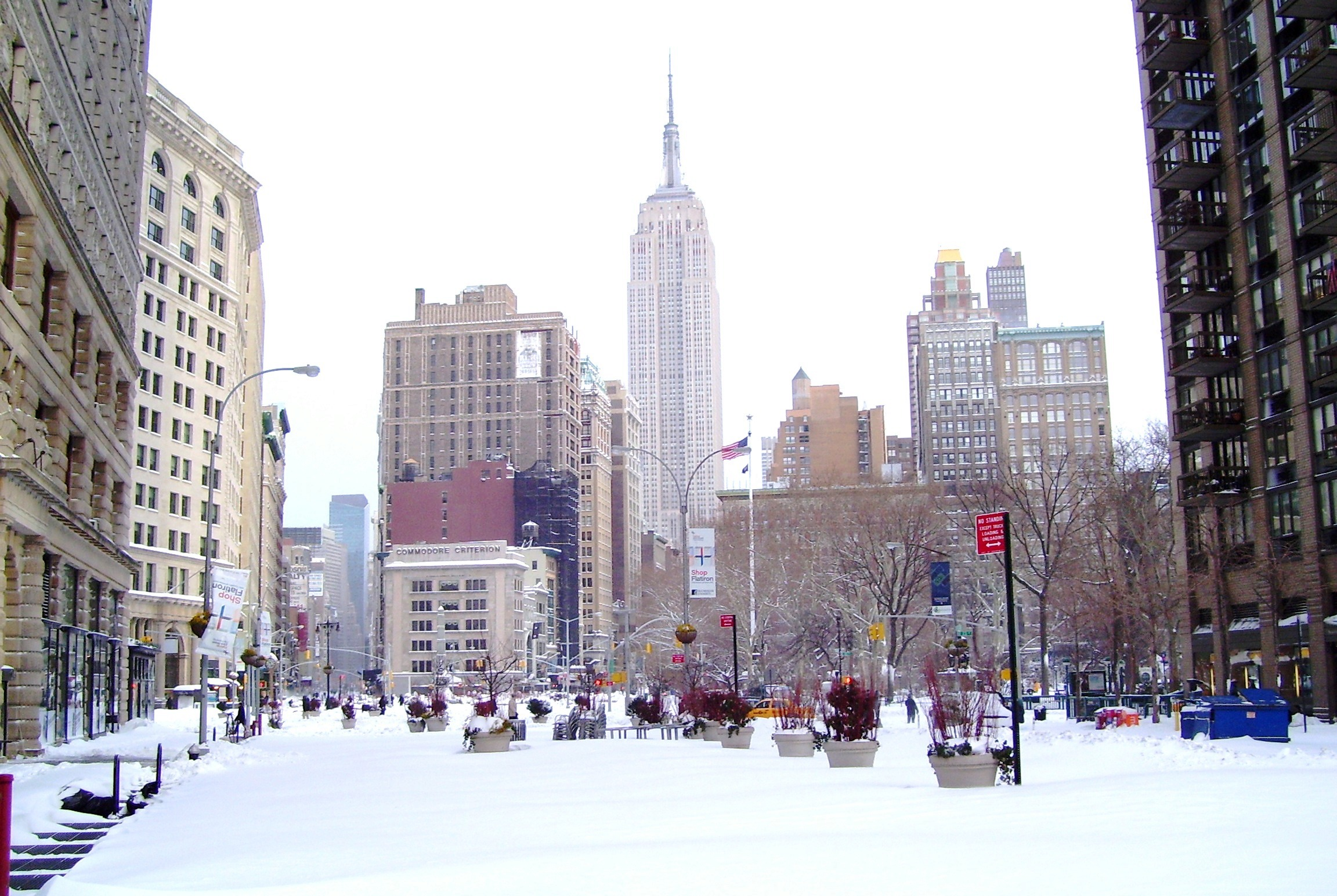
Broadway at end of snowfall

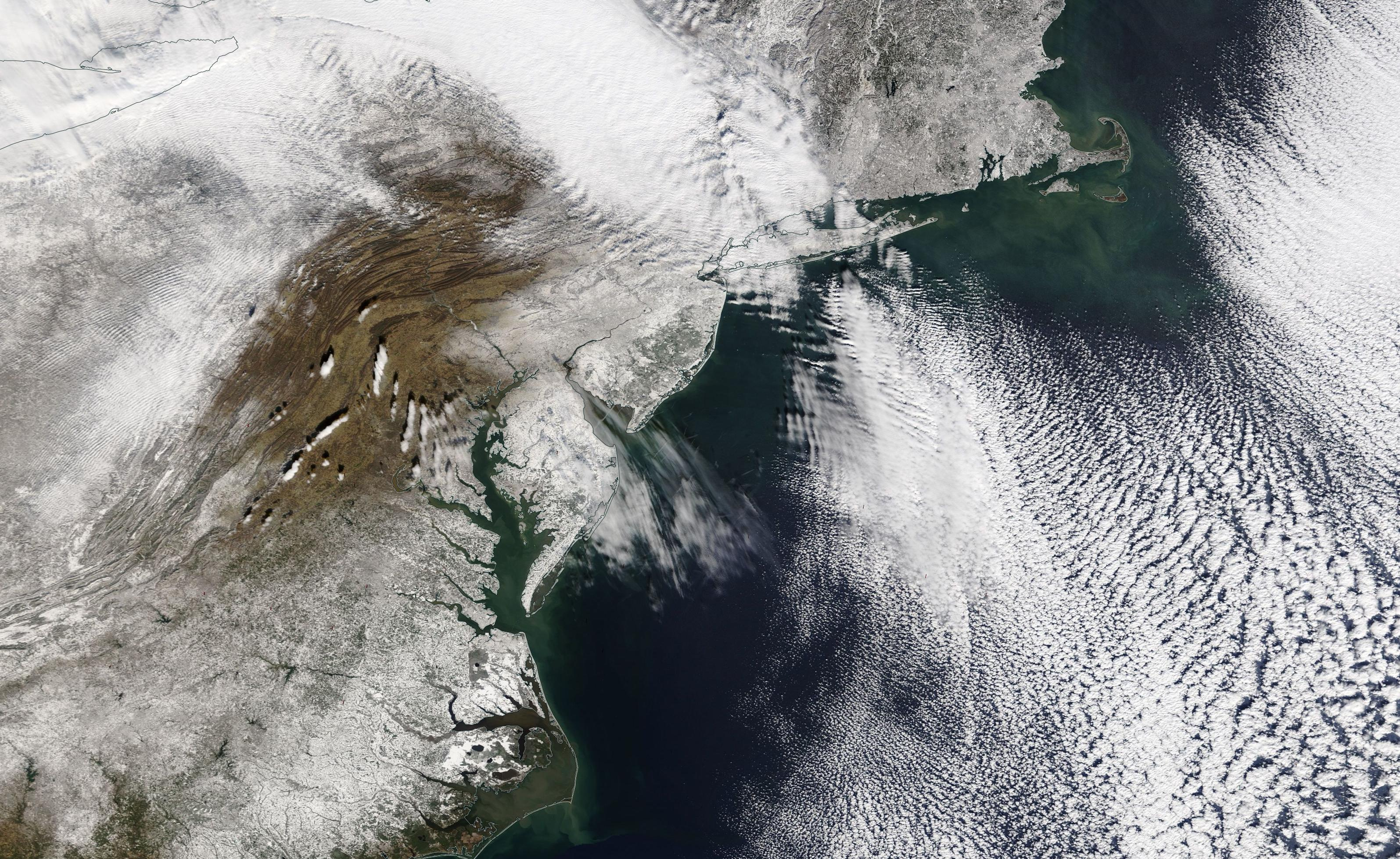
A Satellite view of the snowfall from the blizzard

=== United States ===
==== Southeastern United States ====
Areas in eastern North Carolina and southeastern Virginia saw upwards of 12 inches (30 cm) of snow.

===== North Carolina =====
North Carolina was one of six US states where a state of emergency was declared due to the storm. Snow totals in the state ranged from less than 1 to 10 inches (2.5 to 25.4 cm) in the east, from 5 to 12 inches (13 to 30 cm) in the central part of the state and along the I-95 corridor, and from 3 to 15 inches (7.6 to 38.1 cm) in the west.

==== Mid-Atlantic states ====
Late on December 25, WPVI-TV announced that the National Weather Service had issued blizzard warnings for northern and parts of central New Jersey, New York City, Long Island and coastal southern New England. Amtrak's Acela Express and regular Northeast Regional service was shut down completely between Boston and New York. Areas to the east of New York City received 10 to 20 inches while 20 to 30 inches of snow fell across New York City, Northeast and Central New Jersey and the Lower Hudson Valley. Areas receiving the most snow are between Kendall Park and Elizabeth and between Brick and Atlantic City in New Jersey. This was because multiple convective bands of heavy snow fed in off the ocean into the large stationary very heavy snow band (with occasional lightning) over the areas that received 20 to 30 inches. These areas received snowfall totals over 24.0 inches (61 cm). A secondary heavy snow/rain band formed across Eastern Massachusetts the night of December 26. Southern New England including Boston saw more than 1 foot (30 cm) of snow. Even areas of coastal Virginia saw more than 1 foot (30 cm) of snow, and North Carolina received more than 6.0 inches (15 cm). WCAU-TV in Philadelphia forecast a snowfall of between 10 and 20 inches (25 and 51 cm) in Philadelphia itself (which received 12.2 inches (31 cm)), while nearby Trenton, New Jersey and parts of southern New Jersey were expected to receive snowfalls of 20 inches (51 cm) or more. Wind gusts were expected to reach between 40 and 50 miles per hour (64 and 80 km/h).

Delaware had declared a State of Emergency on Sunday evening.

===== Pennsylvania =====
On December 26, several closures were announced on KYW-1060 (the all-news radio station in Philadelphia), including the Please Touch Museum and Independence National Historical Park. Philadelphia mayor Michael Nutter declared a snow emergency beginning at 2:00 p.m. local time. The NFL game between the Minnesota Vikings and the Philadelphia Eagles at Lincoln Financial Field in Philadelphia, scheduled for Sunday, December 26, was postponed until Tuesday, December 28. Ironically, it was scheduled to be played Sunday afternoon, but flexed to the primetime slot, displacing the San Diego Chargers-Cincinnati Bengals game to the afternoon.

Pittsburgh declared a State of Emergency Sunday afternoon with an expected accumulation of 16 inches (41 cm).

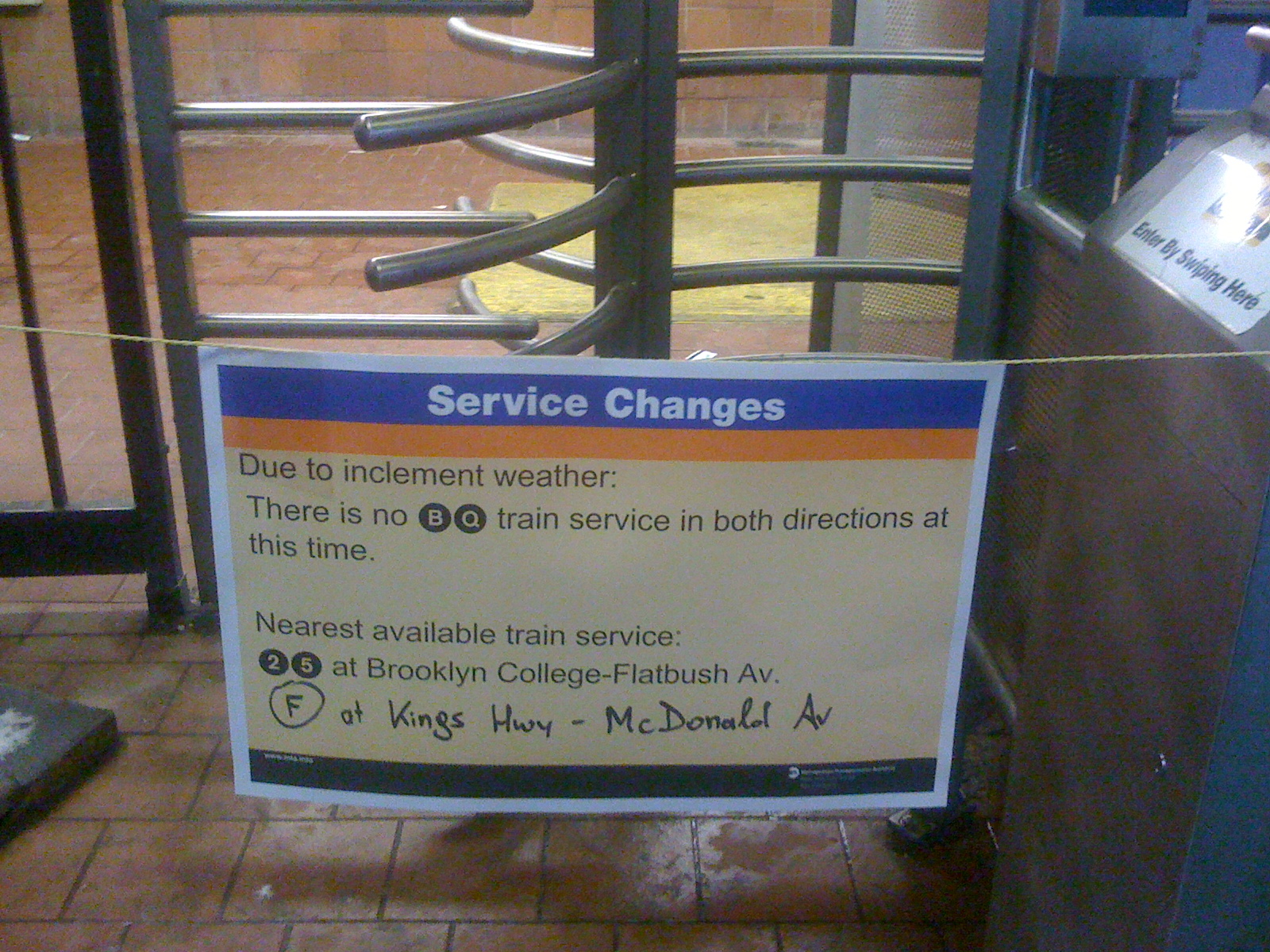
No trains running on the BMT Brighton Line as the result of the storm.

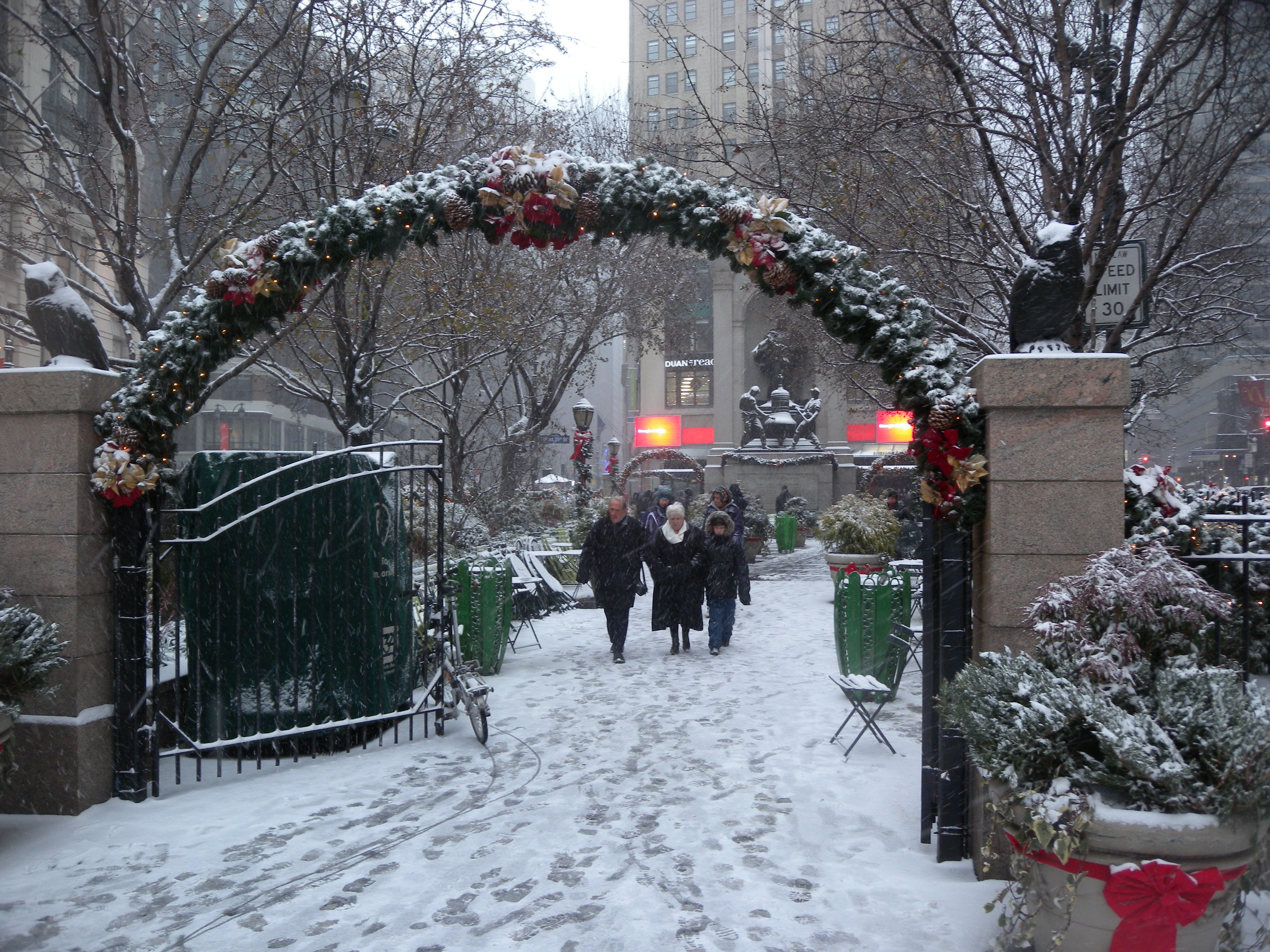
Herald Square

New Yorkers cross a deep melt puddle (half minute video)

===== New York City =====
The Greater New York area had sustained winds of 30–45 MPH with gusts to over 60 MPH during the afternoon and night of December 26. By the storm's end, weather stations in Central Park had recorded 20 inches (51 cm) of snow. A combination of heavy snow and strong winds led to massive transportation lockdowns across the city. Nearly all roads in the city (with the exception of major arteries) were left impassable for many days because of the amount of snow. Hundreds of buses were stuck in the snow. More than 400 passengers were stranded on the A train on the IND Rockaway Line for seven hours starting shortly before 1 a.m. One train did not open its doors when it stopped at the station. Dozens of LIRR trains were frozen onto the platforms. Hundreds of plows were on the road. NYC's major airports, Kennedy, Newark and LaGuardia were shut down until 6:00 p.m. Monday evening. The MTA ran on a limited schedule, even on Tuesday morning, with many above ground subway lines not functioning. By Wednesday, only the Sea Beach Line, Franklin Avenue Line, and Greenport Branch remained suspended. The subway resumed full service on Thursday, the LIRR Friday morning. Areas in and around New York City, which were most impacted by the storm, reported between 12 and 32 inches (30 and 81 cm) of snowfall by Monday morning. Measurement was made difficult due to 4-foot (120 cm) snow drifts caused by the winds. Central Park's reported 20 inches (51 cm) of snow from the storm is the sixth-largest snowfall on record for that location.

Residents of the city were complaining to Mayor Michael Bloomberg about the slowness of the snowplows attempting to reach their areas. By the late afternoon on Tuesday, snowplows had reached the minor streets in Brooklyn. Many residents of Staten Island, however, had yet to see one. Many plows became stuck in the snow that had accumulated on the streets and several could not get through as many residents had simply abandoned their cars in the middle of roads once it became too hazardous or impossible to move. These cars became stuck as the snow accumulated around them, creating roadblocks for the plows. Both Mayor Bloomberg and the chief of the sanitation department were urging residents to stay indoors and not shovel snow back onto the streets that had already been plowed. State Senator Carl Kruger called the response a "Colossal Failure".

Multiple explanations have been proposed for the relatively slow response of the snow cleanup in the New York City metropolitan area. For example, the local media did not fully alert the general public until Christmas Day about the impending storm due to the complexity and lateness of the forecast models predicting the storm; thus, public awareness was delayed. Another possible cause was that Mayor Bloomberg had previously laid off 400 New York City Sanitation workers due to budget cuts; therefore, fewer plows were at work. In addition, some city workers who are responsible for managing the snow removal process had taken the day off from work during the storm due to the Christmas holiday. Also, a snow emergency was not declared, contributing to the number of abandoned cars on the streets.

On December 30, the New York Post reported that several sanitation workers confessed that cleanup was intentionally slowed down to protest the aforementioned budget cuts. On January 3, 2011, WCBS-TV reported that prosecutors had obtained a video of two sanitation trucks driving down 155th Street in Whitestone, Queens after the blizzard with their plows raised so as not to remove the snow. Allegations were also made that sanitation workers slept on the job, hung out at a doughnut shop for 11 straight hours while on the job, and drank beer for six or seven hours while on the job. Claims were also made that supervisors encouraged such work stoppages. However, a month later, The New York Times reported that the allegations of a slowdown remained unsubstantiated and that Councilman Daniel Halloran, who had originally reported the confessions, had not named his sources.

A man who attempted suicide by jumping from a ninth-story window was saved when he landed on a huge pile of garbage that had accumulated during the blizzard. Two casualties were reported as the result of emergency workers being unable to reach those in need: a newborn baby and an elderly woman.

===== New Jersey =====
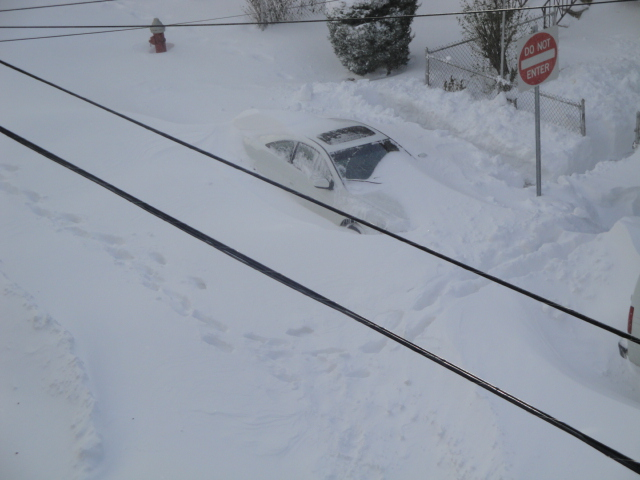
Snowing in Journal Square, Jersey City, New Jersey

New Jersey declared a State of Emergency on Sunday, December 26. They were affected the hardest because of its high winds and snow. Over 20 inches (51 cm) of snow was estimated in some counties such as Union County. Interstate 78, Interstate 80, and Interstate 280 experienced congestion, closures, and accidents. New Jersey Transit suspended all bus service, North Jersey Coast Line service, and Hudson-Bergen Light Rail Service. River Line service had partial closures and the Newark Light Rail was delayed for 20–30 minutes. Many people in the state were stranded on roadways and only emergency vehicles were allowed on the roads.

The highest amount recorded was in Brick, New Jersey, where 36 inches of snow accumulated. The visibility was near 0 miles (0 km). Central and Northeastern New Jersey were hit the hardest with snow totals of 1 to 2.5 feet (30 to 76 cm). Edison got 32.5 inches (83 cm), Lyndhurst got 29 inches (74 cm) and Elizabeth had one of the highest totals of snow of any city affected by this storm, 31.8 inches (81 cm) of heavy snow. Blizzard Warnings were prompted for eastern New Jersey, while Winter Storm Warnings were issued in the western portion. Blowing and drifting snow was a big problem on December 26 and 27.

Newark Liberty International Airport in Newark had received 7 inches (18 cm) of snowfall in about three hours, an instance of very heavy snow in a short time. Snow drifts as high as seven feet were spotted in portions of eastern New Jersey. The NJ Transit was shut down on late December 26 due to blizzard conditions occurring in the area. Cape May was one of many southern New Jersey towns that were affected by snow bands containing four-inch per hour snowfall rates. When the storm was off the coast of New Jersey, bands of heavy snow formed one after another, increasing already-hefty snowfall amounts even further. There were reports of snow plows getting stuck in the snow late at night on December 26 and the early morning of the 27th. On the 26th, visibilities in some towns were less than 0.1 miles. This caused whiteout conditions in towns along the Raritan River and the Atlantic coastline.

Cape May had reported nearly 15 inches of snow after the storm had moved out to sea. The town had lesser snow amounts due to a break in the southern half of the snow bands pivoting toward New Jersey. The snow totals were only expected to reach 10 to 15 inches at the highest. Instead, the highest amount was in Brick, New Jersey where 36 inches fell, nearly 3 feet of snow fell. I-95 Northbound was mostly covered in layers of snow, which was dangerous for some drivers.

The higher snowfall amounts occurred in central and northern coastal areas of New Jersey. The blustery winds in New Jersey gusted as high as 65 mph. The fact of the high winds caused the blizzard warnings to be issued by the Mount Holly, New Jersey (Philadelphia, PA area) National Weather Service officials.

Snow fell so fast that traffic came to a complete halt. Motorists had to be rescued the following day as snow continued to pile up and trap them on interstates and local streets, which themselves became completely impassable. Citizens began calling into news stations asking for help and giving reports, while plows and other emergency personnel became stuck everywhere. Newark Mayor Cory Booker notably used Twitter to help stranded residents and assure citizens.

==== New England ====
===== Connecticut =====
Boston declared a State of Emergency Sunday afternoon with an expected accumulation of over 20 inches (51 cm). Heavy snow and winds of up to 60 miles per hour (97 km/h) caused a gas station roof to collapse in North Haven, and widespread tree damage and power outages throughout the state. Service on the Metro-North New Haven Line and its branches was suspended on Monday due to equipment and switch failures caused by the storm. The greatest snow totals were in the western part of the state, with Wilton receiving 18 inches of snow. North Canaan reported 16.1 inches, and 13.9 inches of snowfall was reported at Bradley International Airport.

The blizzard was nicknamed Winter Storm "Adrienne" by WFSB-TV Channel 3. The local CBS affiliate has unofficially named local winter storms since 1971.

===== Maine =====
Blizzard conditions arrived in Maine on December 27. On December 28, a ski lift at the Sugarloaf ski resort derailed, causing several skiers to receive injuries after falling to the ground, sending seven to the hospital.

===== Massachusetts =====
Coastal Massachusetts, along with coastal Maine, bore the brunt of the storm with a recorded wind gust of 153 km/h (95 mph) in Scituate, Massachusetts. Wind gusts routinely over 50 miles per hour (80 km/h) were widespread during the blizzard in coastal areas. Hurricane-force wind gusts of 80 miles per hour (130 km/h) were recorded along coastal portions of Eastern Massachusetts. A wind gust of 94.4 miles per hour (151.9 km/h) was recorded in Grand Etang, Nova Scotia. High winds caused near zero visibilities and treacherous travel conditions in many areas. The strong easterly winds also piled up water along the eastern coast of Massachusetts, leading to major coastal flood damage.

=== Atlantic Canada ===
In Atlantic Canada, the nor'easter was the fourth major winter storm to hit the area in four weeks. Blizzard conditions forced numerous road closures and resulted in the death of a minivan driver on December 27 near Fredericton, Prince Edward Island. Wind gusts approached 150 km/h (93 mph), and up to 40 cm (16 in) of snow fell in New Brunswick, while Nova Scotia was hit by heavy rain and unseasonably warm temperatures and rain continued in eastern Newfoundland.

== See also ==
- Pineapple Express
- January 2010 North American winter storms
- February 5–6, 2010 North American blizzard
- February 9–10, 2010 North American blizzard
- February 25–27, 2010 North American blizzard
- March 2010 nor'easter
- January 31 – February 2, 2011 North American blizzard
- North American blizzard of 2006
- December 2009 North American blizzard
- December 2014 North American storm complex
- January 2015 North American blizzard
- December 15–17, 2020 nor'easter
