= Blizzard of 2009 =

Blizzard of 2009 may refer to:

- North American Blizzard of 2009
- European winter storms of 2009–10
- February 2009 Great Britain and Ireland snowfall
- 2009 North American Christmas blizzard
