= Snowmageddon =

Portmanteau referring to a severe snowstorm

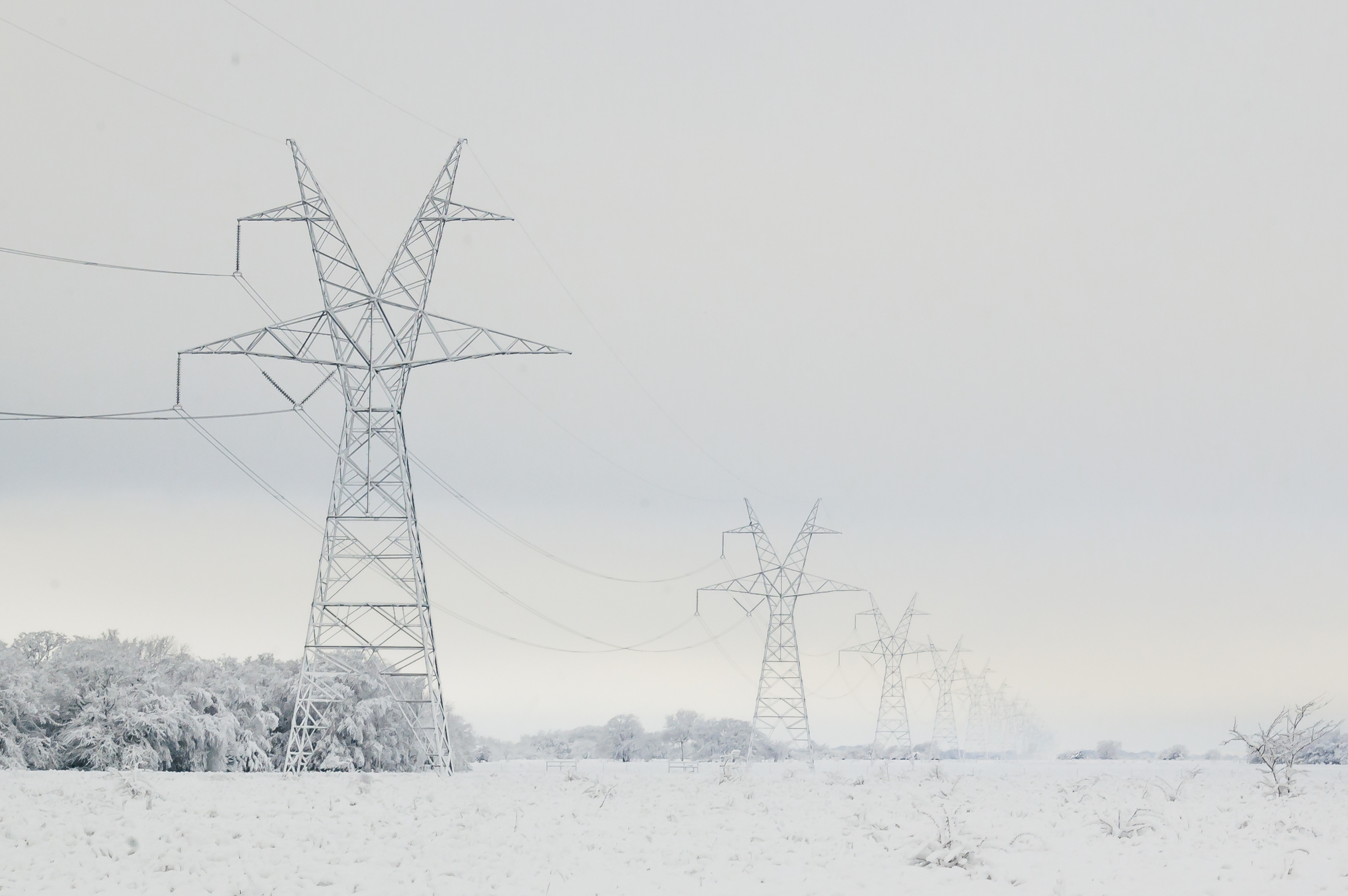
Transmission towers and power lines in East Texas snow from the 2010 North American Blizzard

Snowmageddon, Snowpocalypse, and Snowzilla are portmanteaus of the word "snow" with "Armageddon", "Apocalypse", and "Godzilla" respectively. Snowmageddon and Snowpocalypse were used in the popular press in Canada during January 2009, and was also used in January 2010 by The Guardian reporter Charlie Brooker to characterise the sensationalist reaction of television news to a period of snowfall across the UK. The Washington Post, out of Washington, D.C., ran an online poll asking for reader feedback prior to the February 5–6, 2010 North American blizzard on February 4, 2010, and several blogs, including the Washington Post's own blog, followed that up by using either "Snowmageddon" or "Snowpocalypse" before, during, and after the storm hit.

The Washington Post also popularized the term "kaisersnoze" (see Keyser Söze) in response to the February snowstorms.

During the evening preceding the first blizzard hitting Washington, D.C., most of the United States federal government closed, and press coverage continued to characterize the storm using either "Snowmageddon", "Snowpocalypse", or both.

The term "Snowpocalypse" was used in the Pacific Northwest to refer to a snowstorm in December 2008.

The 2008 children's book Winter Blast by Chris Wright, uses the term "snowmageddon" in the storyline of the book.

== Examples ==
- The Great Blizzard of '93 (Superstorm)
- January 2000 North American blizzard (Snowmageddon in Raleigh)
- North American blizzard of 2009 (Snowpocalypse)
- February 5–6, 2010 North American blizzard (Snowmageddon)
- February 9–10, 2010 North American blizzard (Snowmageddon: Snoverkill)
- February 25–27, 2010 North American blizzard (Snowicane)
- December 2010 North American blizzard (remembered as Snowmageddon in Lambton County)
- January 31 – February 2, 2011 North American blizzard (remembered as Snowmageddon in Chicago)
- February 2013 nor'easter (also described by The Atlantic as a snowpocalypse or snowmageddon)
- January 2014 Gulf Coast winter storm (remembered as Snowmageddon in Atlanta)
- January 2–4, 2014 North American blizzard (Snowpocalypse)
- November 13 – 21, 2014 North American winter storm (Snow Blitz, Snowvember)
- A series of storms in winter 2015 that broke snowfall records in Boston, Massachusetts (Snowmageddon, snowpocalypse)
- January 2016 United States blizzard (Snowzilla)
- Winter of 2009–2010 in the United Kingdom (Big Freeze, Snowmageddon)
- Winter of 2010–2011 in the United Kingdom (Snowmageddon in Scotland)
- January 17, 2020 in St. John's, Canada blizzard (Snowmageddon)
- February 13–17, 2021 North American winter storm (Great Texas Freeze, Snowmageddon 2021)
- January 2026 North American winter storm (Snowmageddon 2026)

== See also ==
- The dictionary definition of Snowmageddon at Wiktionary
- 1993 Storm of the Century
- 1991 Perfect Storm
- Hurricane Sandy
- Perfect storm
- White Juan
