= Winter storms of 2009–10 in East Asia =

The East Asian snowstorms of 2009–2010 were heavy winter storms, including blizzards, ice storms, and other winter events, that affected East Asia from 8 May 2009 to 28 February 2010. The areas affected included Mongolia, China (the P.R.C.), Nepal, the Korean Peninsula, Japan, Kuril Islands, Sea of Okhotsk, Primorsky, and Sakhalin Island.

== The list of events ==
The south of the region covered by this article's cold wave

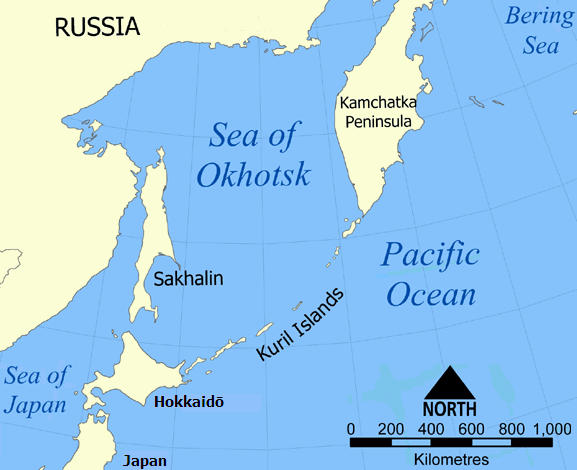
The north of the region covered by this article's cold wave

An unusually cold and/or snowy weather was reported across the Northern Hemisphere, with many severe cases being reported in the United States, Canada, the UK, Poland, Finland, Russia, India, South Korea, China and Japan. As this occurred, unusually heavy rain hit Brazil, southern Bangladesh, Italy and Argentina. A heat wave and unforeseen monsoon weather also hit Australia. Guam was hit by a typhoon on December 29, 2009.

=== 2009 ===
==== May 8 ====
===== Mongolia =====
21 people had died in a rural Mongolian blizzard.

==== June 2 ====
===== Mongolia =====
Another 15 people and 10,000 head of cattle had died by this date in Mongolia.

==== September 4 ====
===== Russia =====
A heavy storm hit parts of the Beaufort Sea and parts of the Chukchi Sea on September 4.

==== October 3 ====
===== Russia =====
A heavy cyclone hit the Bering Sea and parts of the Chukchi Sea.

==== October 12 ====
===== China =====
On October 12, 2009, Just over 200 herdsmen and 1,000 heads of livestock had been stranded by heavy snowfalls in Ali prefecture in Tibet. The week-long snowfall had accumulated to about 30 centimetres in Pulan County of Ali., with some areas reaching 1 meter depth, according to Xing Xiuyin, head of an armed police detachment stationed in the Tibetan region. 30 soldiers and two snow-clearing machines were sent on the way to Ali, according to Xing Xiuyin. Thousands of people were trapped as heavy snow fell in Tibet's Lhunze County, but rescue services managed to minimize the casualties and housing losses. The rescue services also managed to provide shelter and emergency fodder for 200 head of cattle.

==== October 13 ====
===== China =====
Snow was reported by Chinese authorities to be falling in Qinghai and Heilongjiang Provinces.

==== October 31 ====
===== Russia =====
Heavy snowfall hit Russia's Primorsky Territory on October 31, as the cold wind storm moved from the Sea of Okhotsk to the coast of the Kamchatka Peninsula, bringing heavy snow and rain to the region that meteorologists expected to last another 24 hours. They also warned of temperatures would fall by up to 15 degrees and that weather conditions could make traveling difficult as snowfall in the Vladivostok area had already significantly impeded travel by larger vehicles. The city administration's official Yevgeny Kolpinets told the Russian news agency Itar-Tass the inclement weather had stopped bus traffic in the city, but luckily no energy supply service problems had been reported

==== November 9 ====
===== China =====
The Harbin Snow Festival took place in Harbin, Heilongjiang, China, amidst unusually heavy snow. The festival was first started in 1985 and had never seen such heavy snow fall since its foundation. During three worst snow storms since 1949 have claimed 40 lives in, destroyed thousands of buildings and killed almost 500,000 acres (202,343 ha) (200,000 hectares) of winter crops, according to the Civil Affairs Ministry. The snowfall is the heaviest in the provinces of Hebei, Shanxi, Shaanxi, Shandong and Henan since the establishment of the Communist state in 1949.

==== November 13 ====
===== China =====
Heavy snowfall in China causes a school building to collapse and the death of 38 people.

==== November 25 ====
===== Russia =====
On November 25, a cold cyclone approaches to Russia's Primorsky Territory from the Yellow Sea. Temperature drops to –2 °C, with nighttime temperature as low as –25 °C. Over the next week, the daytime temperature ranges from 2 °C to –10 °C, with nighttime temperature of between –24 and –25 °C. The wind speed was as fast as 11 meters per second. Both ice and avalanche warnings were issued as heavy snow was predicted for both Primorsky Krai and Amur Krai.

==== December 21 ====
===== Mongolia =====
Mongolia's snowstorms killed 2,000 cattle and 2 people.

==== December 23 ====
===== Russia =====
A Winter storm hit parts of Tannu Tuva, while a Siberian cyclone started up over Yakutia and headed for Khabarovsk Krai.

Heavy snow hit both Primorsky (Primorye) Krai, Khabarovsk Krai, Sakhalin Oblast, Kamchatka Krai. Migratory cyclone bringing a warm spell and snowstorms reaching Primorsky on the Friday. Heavy snow badly disrupted life in Vladivostok on December the expected snow, sleet and gale-force wind occurred on Primorsky Krai's south coast. Over the two days temperatures rose from –4 °C up to –2 °C.

==== December 25 ====
===== Russia =====
The strengthening cyclone began drifting to the southern coast of Primorsky and over Sakhalin Krai. Snow also falls in Amur Oblast.

President Vladimir Putin visited Vladivostok.

==== December 30 ====
===== China =====
Starting December 30, temperatures in Harbin began to drop as low as –30 °C (–15 °F)

===== Russia =====
On December 30 an emergency warning about another cyclone was issued along Russia’s Pacific Coast. The blizzards and a sharp fall of air temperatures hit the Sea of Okhotsk and the surrounding territories of Primorsky Krai, Sakhalin Oblast, Khabarovsk Krai and Magadan Oblast. The Far Eastern territorial centre of the federal Ministry for Emergency Situations and Civil Defence (E.M.E.R.C.O.M.) warned that the cyclone would produce snow banks, icy condition on automobile roads in the, as well as snow bringing down phone and power transmission lines in Primorsky territory. The temperatures reckoned to have fallen near to the expected –7 °C. The temperature was that which usually occurs in a Siberian cyclone, when it reaches the Russian Far East. Forecasters said there was a strong possibility of heavy snowfall and blizzards along the eastern districts of the Khabarovsk Krai, in parts of the Sakhalin Island and on the southern Kuril Islands December 31 and January 1. Authorities and rescue services in Sakhalin Oblast were put on alert and warned of a high risks of avalanches on the island's numerous hills and mountains. Another avalanche warning was in effect on the 2nd, for Sakhalin Island, due to hazardous levels of snow fall during yet another Siberian snow cyclone and blizzard, emergency officials said.

=== 2010 ===
==== January 1–2 ====
===== China =====
50-year record low temperatures and snowfall hit northern China.

===== Korea =====
70-year record low temperatures and snowfall in Korea.

==== January 4 ====
===== China =====
Heavy snow in northern China grounded hundreds of flights. Beijing was hit by a blizzard starting the evening of the 2nd, with 70–80% of flights cancelled out of Beijing Capital International Airport, on January 4., and close to 20 cm of snow fell in the north of the city, and close to 25 cm in Seoul. Schools across the area were closed, and Premier Wen asked local governments to ensure safe transportation, continued food supplies, and continued agricultural production. Continued snowstorms were forecast for the city of Beijing and the province of Inner Mongolia. It was also predicted on January 7 for snow to reach the provinces of Jiangsu, Anhui, Henan and Hubei on January 9 according to China National Radio. One person was killed in Xinjiang Autonomous Region as a result of the storm. Emergency services handed out extra cattle fodder in Tibet.

Civil authorities were put on a major alert in the snow-torn province of Shandong

Many motorways in Shandong were closed and 19 flights cancelled in the Yantai International Airport. Eventually the No. 1820 train, carrying more than 800 passengers, started off after being stranded for 12 hours.

===== Japan =====
Japan's Hokkaido island was hit by heavier snowfall, causing heavy travel disruption and some airport closures. Further snow was reported in Niigata, Japan.

===== Korea =====
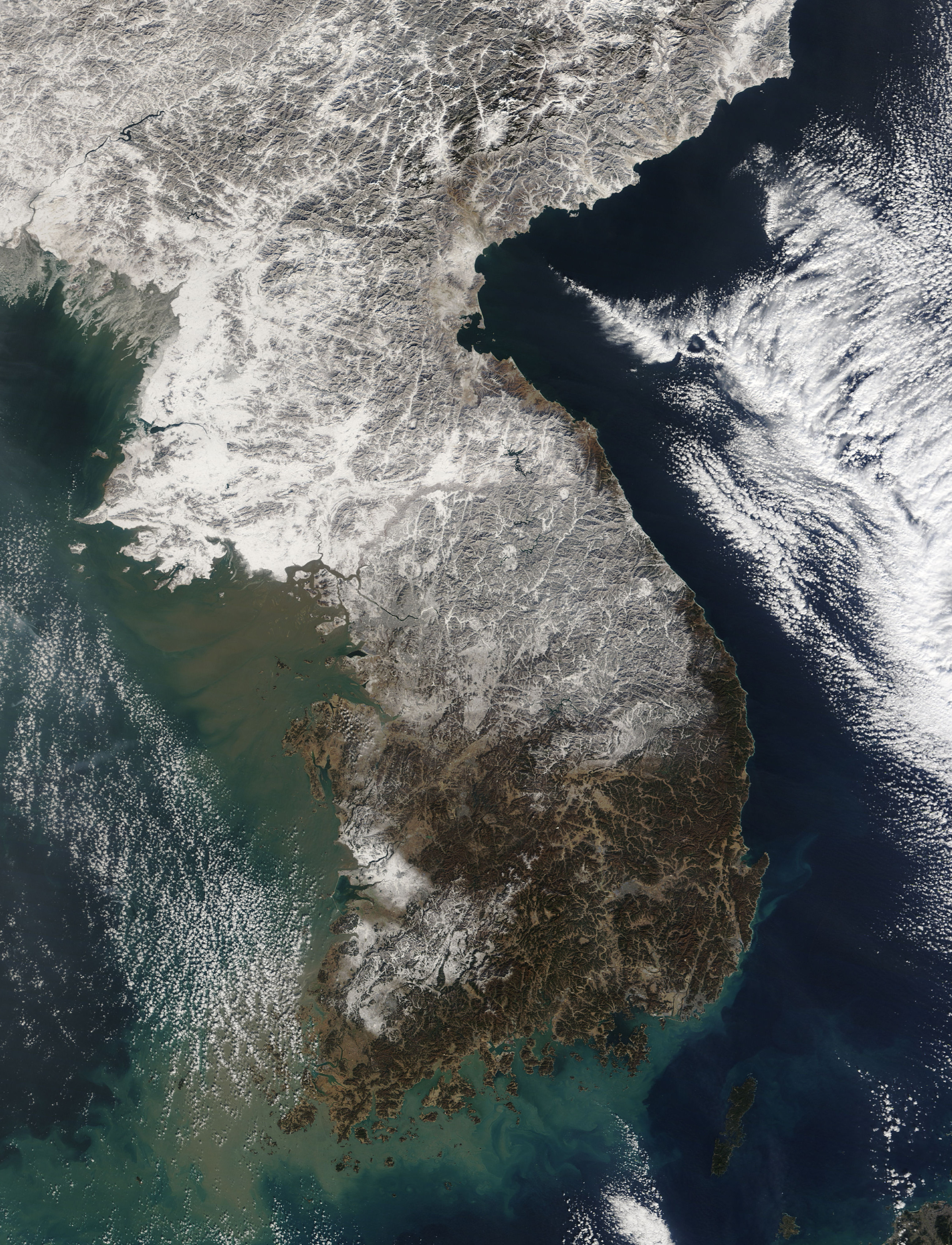
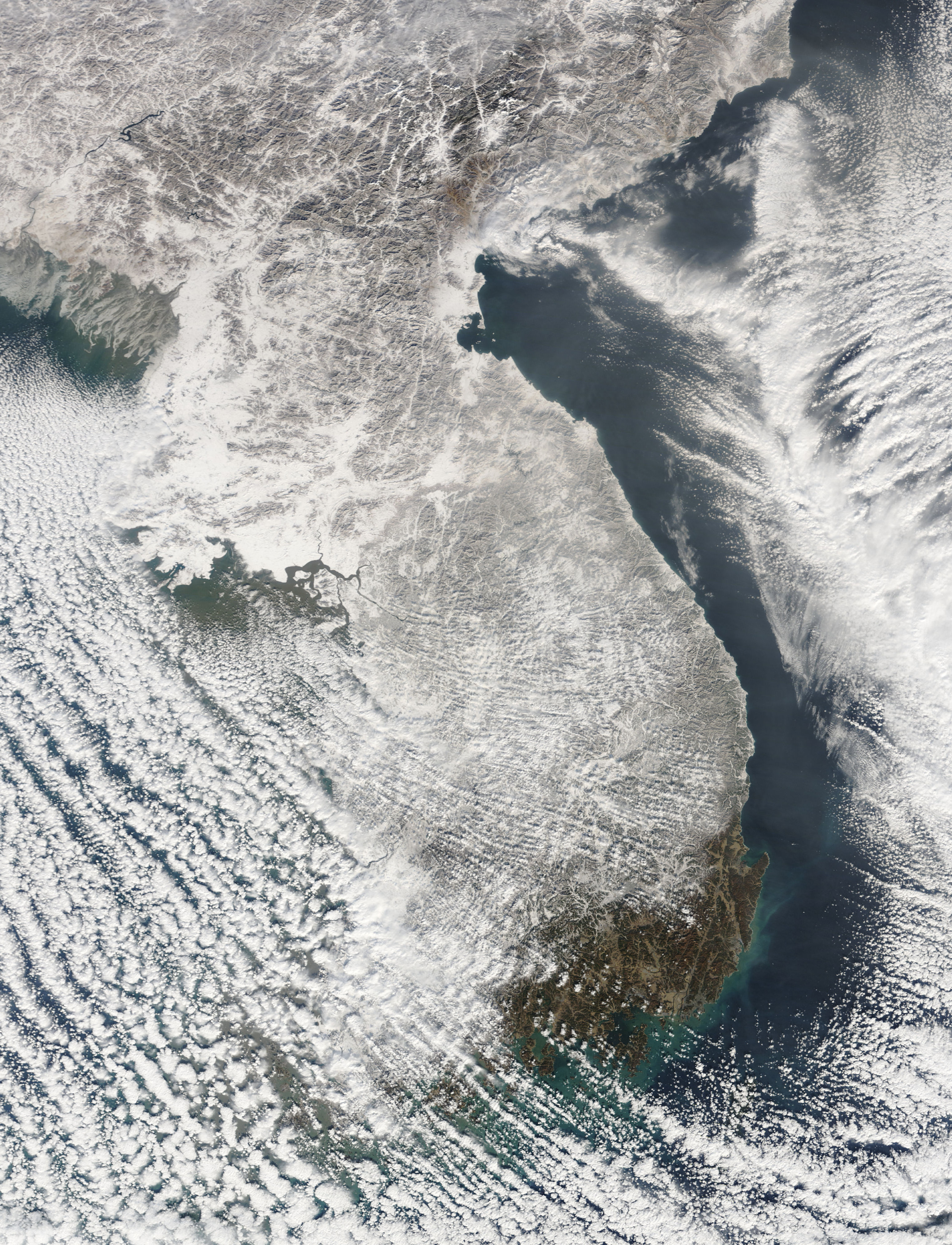
The satellite images of the Korean Peninsula before the snow (left) and after the snow (right)

January 4 saw Seoul's worst snow fall since 1937 according to the Korea Meteorological Administration (KMA). The blizzard dumped 25.8 cm of snow on the metropolitan area.

===== Russia =====
Avalanches and heavy snow hit the Russian's Sakhalin Island, which was smothered by a snow cyclone and blizzard, the Island’s emergency officials said.

==== January 5 ====
===== China =====
8 inches (20 centimeters) of snowfall was recorded in Beijing, the largest since 1951. Amid the heavy snow, Beijing saw a smooth flow of traffic, with no gridlock or serious traffic accidents being reported after the snow storm that caused traffic chaos on the 4th. The city's bus and subway services were up and running. During the peak hours on Monday morning, the Beijing Subway Operating Company dispatched 20 additional trains to ease the heavy passenger flow. The bus of all routes started off on time that morning.

Inner Mongolia was still in a critical situation as teams battled to clear severe rural snow drifts.

===== Russia =====
The last Russian Far Eastern storms dissipated out in the Gulf of Alaska.

==== January 6 ====
===== China =====
The 2,000 weather modification offices in China, which are responsible for cloud seeding for rain, was put into use.

Schools in Beijing and Tianjin closed and because the cities’ traffic was in chaos on the 6th. The capital received its biggest snow fall since 1951, then immediately followed by the harshest Siberian winds in decades. Temperatures for the 5th were forecast to plunge to –16 °C, a 40-year low, after a day-time maximum of –8 °C. The head of the Beijing Meteorological Bureau, Guo Hu, linked the blizzard-like conditions this week to unusual atmospheric patterns caused by global warming.

On the Monday, many motorways in Shandong were closed and 19 flights cancelled in the Yantai International Airport.

===== Korea =====
Heavy snow started to fall in Seoul, South Korea and it was reported that a leading North Korean Communist party official had frozen to death in his home in Sepo County.

==== January 7 ====
===== China =====
Continued snowstorms were forecast for the city of Beijing and the province of Inner Mongolia. Electricity rationing started on January 7. Snow had started falling in Gansu province by January 7. It also was projected on January 7 to have reached the provinces of Jiangsu, Anhui, Henan and Hubei on January 9 according to China National Radio The Chinese government said that China faced its worst ice risk in 30 years. By the night of January 8–9, the major snow storms predicted on January 7 for the provinces of Jiangsu and Anhui, had arrived and the emergency services were put on alert.

Continued snowstorms are forecast for the city of Beijing and the province of Inner Mongolia. Snow reached the provinces of Jiangsu, Anhui, Henan and Hubei on January 9. One person was killed in Xinjiang Autonomous Region as a result of the storm.

On January 10, 1 person died and 5,435 were evacuated after snowstorm in Xinjiang Uygur Autonomous Region on January 10 according to the Ministry of Civil Affairs. A total of 261,800 people in 12 counties or cities were affected by the blizzards.

===== Nepal =====
25 Nepalese people, mostly children, died as a blizzard swept over most of Nepal on January 7.

Snow storms were also probably in mountainous Bhutan and Sikkim, but no reports were forthcoming.

=== 2010 ===
==== January 12 ====
===== China =====
Coal supplies ran low at power plants as the death toll rose to two in the current, strong snowstorm in Altai and temperatures fell to –40 °C on January 12.

==== January 14 ====
Snow began to relent in China, Korea and Japan.

== See also ==
- 2008 Chinese winter storms
- December 2009 North American blizzard
- 2009 North American Christmas blizzard
- 2009 Global storm activity
- 2010 Global storm activity
- 2010 China drought and dust storms
- 2010 Russian wildfires
- 2010 China floods
- 2011 New Zealand snowstorms
- Arctic dipole anomaly
- Siberian High
- Winter of 2009–10 in Europe
- Winter of 2009–10 in Great Britain and Ireland
