= 2009 North American Christmas blizzard =

Weather event in the United States and Canada

2009 Christmas Blizzard
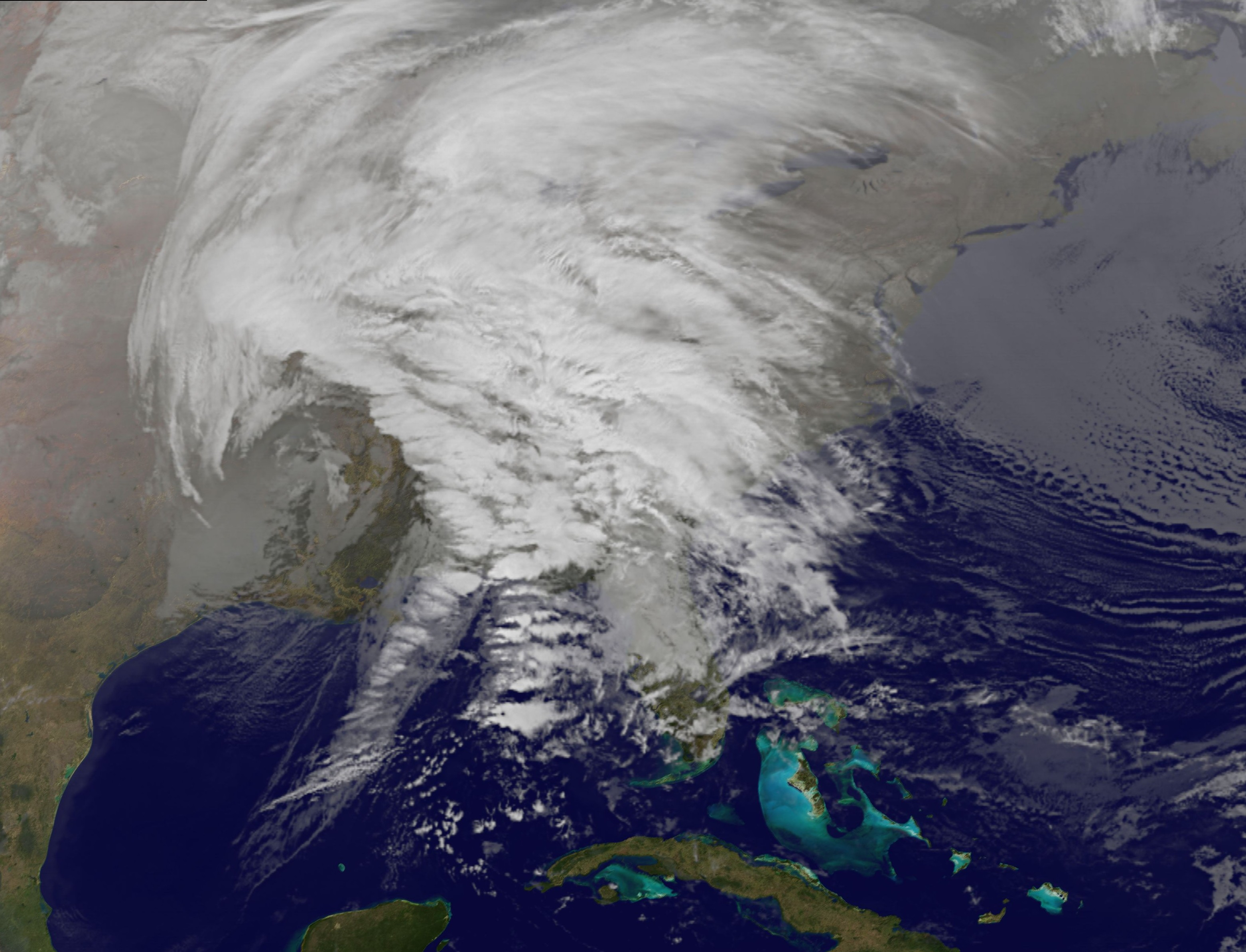
- Satellite image of the storm on Christmas Eve.

Meteorological history
- Formed: December 22, 2009
- Dissipated: December 28, 2009

Category 5 "Extreme" blizzard
- Regional snowfall index: 19.62 (NOAA)
- Lowest pressure: 985 millibars (985 hPa)
- Max. snowfall: 40.0 inches (102 cm) (Lead, South Dakota)

Tornado outbreak
- Tornadoes: 28
- Max. rating: EF3 tornado

Overall effects
- Fatalities: 21
- Areas affected: Midwest, Great Plains, Parts of Ontario, Eastern Seaboard
- Part of the Tornadoes of 2009 and 2009–10 North American winter

The 2009 North American Christmas blizzard was a powerful winter storm and severe weather event that affected the Midwestern United States, Great Plains, Southeastern United States, the Eastern Seaboard, and parts of Ontario. The storm began to develop on December 22 before intensifying to produce extreme winds and precipitation by the morning of December 24. The storm's rapid development made it difficult for forecasters to predict. The blizzard was reported to have claimed at least 21 lives, and disrupted air travel during the Christmas travel season. In the Southeastern and Central United States, an outbreak of 28 tornadoes occurred between December 23–24.

== Impact ==
=== Snowfall ===
Snowfall varied across the United States. South Dakota likely received the most, with 30.8 inches (78 cm). In Minnesota, 26 inches (66 cm) was received near Pequaywan Lake on the state's North Shore. Parts of Texas recorded snowfall as high as 9 inches (23 cm) in Post. Snowfall in Nebraska caused six deaths. In Oklahoma, a state of emergency was declared after blizzard conditions killed 3 people and dropped 19 inches (48 cm) of snow. Iowa saw high snowfall as well.

The storm was so intense that it wrapped warm air around the north and west side of it and cold air and snow blew in from the south. Rochester, Minnesota, in the northern half of the storm, saw rain with temperatures in the mid 30s Fahrenheit (~2°C) while snow was falling just to the west in a 1,300-mile (2,100 km) band stretching from Canada south to at least Dallas, Texas, giving that region its first "White Christmas" since 1929. I-29 was completely closed in North and South Dakota, and then in stretches into Missouri. Will Rogers World Airport was also shut down.

=== Rain ===
Heavy rain in parts of the Midwest prompted the National Weather Service to issue Flood Warnings for many areas. The maximum rainfall amount recorded was 6.89 inches (17.5 cm) in Little Rock, Arkansas. Freezing rain fell across Iowa and Illinois, affecting travel to and from O'Hare International Airport. The Chicago area saw as much as ten inches of snow following the freezing rain and sleet.

=== Tornado outbreak ===
Several houses were destroyed near Lafayette, Louisiana, possibly by a tornado. Near Longview, Texas an EF2 tornado left a path of destruction nearly one mile long. Another tornado near Lufkin, Texas produced EF3 damage and caused two injuries.

==== Confirmed tornadoes ====
Confirmed tornadoes by Enhanced Fujita rating
EFU	EF0	EF1	EF2	EF3	EF4	EF5	Total
0	15	7	5	1	0	0	28

===== December 23 event =====
List of confirmed tornadoes – Wednesday, December 23, 2009 (Note: All dates are based on the local time zone where the tornado touched down; however, all times are in Coordinated Universal Time for consistency.)
EF#	Location	County / Parish	State	Start Coord.	Time (UTC)	Path length	Max width	Damage	Summary
EF0	NE of Jacksonville	Cherokee	TX	32.0069°N 95.18°W	20:35-20:40	2.28 miles (3.67 km)	50 yards (46 m)	Unknown	Damage was limited to a few trees.
EF0	NE of New Summerfield	Cherokee	TX	32.1051°N 95.026°W	21:04-21:06	2.79 miles (4.49 km)	50 yards (46 m)	$0	Damage was limited to a few trees.
EF2	Longview	Gregg	TX	32.4919°N 94.69°W	22:39-22:56	7.03 miles (11.31 km)	200 yards (180 m)	$1,000,000	Numerous industrial buildings, including a FedEx building, were heavily damaged. Several houses were also damaged and significant tree damage along its path.
EF1	SE of Avinger	Cass	TX	32.8887°N 94.5039°W	23:51-23:52	0.12 miles (0.19 km)	50 yards (46 m)	$0	A brief tornado in a wooded area damaged numerous trees and tree branches.
EF0	NNE of Recklaw	Rusk	TX	31.978°N 94.9474°W	01:16-01:17	0.11 miles (0.18 km)	150 yards (140 m)	$0	A brief tornado snapped a few trees.
EF3	Lufkin	Angelina	TX	31.3139°N 94.7152°W	03:56-04:07	4.06 miles (6.53 km)	300 yards (270 m)	$10,000,000	Three buildings were destroyed, including a welding shop and a funeral home. Many houses sustained significant roof damage and tree damage was widespread, including in a park. Several 18-wheelers were also thrown. Two people were injured.
EF1	SE of Atlanta	Cass (TX), Miller (AR)	TX, AR	33.038°N 94.0623°W	04:10-04:18	4.79 miles (7.71 km)	150 yards (140 m)	$100	One house sustained minor roof damage, and many trees and limbs were damaged.
EF1	SE of Garrison	Nacogdoches	TX	31.7794°N 94.4908°W	04:37-04:38	0.49 miles (0.79 km)	50 yards (46 m)	$1,000	Several trees were snapped and a small storage building was destroyed.
EF2	SW of Carthage	Shelby, Panola	TX	31.93°N 94.38°W	05:26-05:49	10.13 miles (16.30 km)	200 yards (180 m)	$250,000	Many houses were damaged, including roof and shingle damage. A barn and two mobile homes were destroyed.

===== December 24 event =====
List of confirmed tornadoes – Thursday, December 24, 2009
EF#	Location	County / Parish	State	Start Coord.	Time (UTC)	Path length	Max width	Damage	Summary
EF0	E of Pineland	Sabine	TX	31.261°N 93.9564°W	08:10-08:12	1.28 miles (2.06 km)	100 yards (91 m)	$1,000	Numerous trees and a few power lines were snapped.
EF0	S of Pleasant Hill	Sabine	LA	31.7458°N 93.507°W	09:24-09:26	1.19 miles (1.92 km)	75 yards (69 m)	$0	Several pecan trees were uprooted.
EF0	E of Fairmont	Sabine	TX	31.2082°N 93.729°W	09:28-09:29	0.29 miles (0.47 km)	50 yards (46 m)	$1,000	A brief tornado inflicted damage to trees and power lines along Toledo Bend Reservoir.
EF0	N of Many	Sabine	LA	31.5842°N 93.4995°W	10:21-10:25	2.67 miles (4.30 km)	75 yards (69 m)	$0	Numerous large pine trees were uprooted.
EF0	SW of Martin	Red River	LA	32.0301°N 93.234°W	11:36-11:39	2.76 miles (4.44 km)	50 yards (46 m)	$0	A few large trees were downed.
EF2	Whiteville	St. Landry, Avoyelles	LA	30.7703°N 92.1534°W	13:25-13:37	9.37 miles (15.08 km)	50 yards (46 m)	$510,000	A small church on cinder blocks was destroyed. A rice silo was thrown into a bayou and two tractor-trailers were also damaged.
EF2	N of Crowley	Acadia	LA	30.24°N 92.4°W	13:27-13:39	6.64 miles (10.69 km)	100 yards (91 m)	$4,000,000	At least 30 houses were damaged, primarily in a single subdivision that was especially hard hit where four houses were heavily damaged. The worst damage was a house that completely lost its roof. Four people were injured.
EF0	E of Evergreen	Avoyelles	LA	30.9143°N 92.0981°W	13:37-13:45	4.96 miles (7.98 km)	25 yards (23 m)	$5,000	Several trees were damaged.
EF0	W of Branch	Acadia	LA	30.3442°N 92.3752°W	13:40-13:45	2.08 miles (3.35 km)	25 yards (23 m)	$3,000	A small outbuilding was destroyed and a few trees were blown down.
EF0	Richard (1st tornado)	Acadia	LA	30.38°N 92.35°W	13:46-13:49	2.92 miles (4.70 km)	25 yards (23 m)	$5,000	Several trees were blown down, and a mobile home and barn were damaged.
EF1	Richard (2nd tornado)	Acadia	LA	30.3647°N 92.505°W	13:50-13:55	1.72 miles (2.77 km)	25 yards (23 m)	$20,000	A house and a church were damaged in town. Many trees were also damaged.
EF1	N of Iota	Acadia	LA	30.4239°N 92.3223°W	13:50-13:52	1.53 miles (2.46 km)	25 yards (23 m)	$20,000	A barn was destroyed, and two mobile homes lost their roofs.
EF0	W of Savoy	Acadia, St. Landry	LA	30.47°N 92.31°W	13:53-13:56	2.71 miles (4.36 km)	25 yards (23 m)	$7,000	A barn was damaged, along with many trees.
EF2	Gueydan	Vermilion	LA	29.98°N 92.53°W	13:57-14:03	5.58 miles (8.98 km)	50 yards (46 m)	$1,000,000	Two structures were destroyed, a mobile home which rolled and an outbuilding which was thrown into a water tower, and over 50 others were damaged, some of them heavily.
EF0	S of Chataignier	St. Landry, Evangeline	LA	30.5178°N 92.3095°W	13:58-14:02	2.07 miles (3.33 km)	25 yards (23 m)	$5,000	An outbuilding was damaged by the tornado.
EF0	NW of Long Bridge	Avoyelles	LA	31.0376°N 92.0443°W	13:59-14:00	0.26 miles (0.42 km)	10 yards (9.1 m)	$3,000	A mobile home was heavily damaged by the brief tornado.
EF1	SSE of Morse	Acadia	LA	30.0778°N 92.484°W	14:05-14:09	3.11 miles (5.01 km)	25 yards (23 m)	$50,000	A tornado quickly touched down after the first Gueydan tornado dissipated. Three houses and an entire farm were damaged.
EF1	W of Farmerville	Union	LA	32.77°N 92.54°W	14:20-14:26	5.96 miles (9.59 km)	150 yards (140 m)	$100,000	Two houses were damaged on the shores of Lake Darbonne. Many trees were snapped or knocked down.
EF0	E of Vancleave	Jackson	MS	30.6426°N 88.8108°W	21:50-21:53	0.3 miles (0.48 km)	20 yards (18 m)	$2,000	A brief tornado damaged a few trees.

== See also ==
- Global storm activity of 2009
- December 2009 North American blizzard
- February 2009 Great Britain and Ireland snowfall
- East Asian snowstorms of 2009-2010
- East Asian snowstorms of late 2009
- December 2009 North American snowstorms
- List of North American tornadoes and tornado outbreaks
