= February 5–6, 2010 North American blizzard =

Weather event in North America

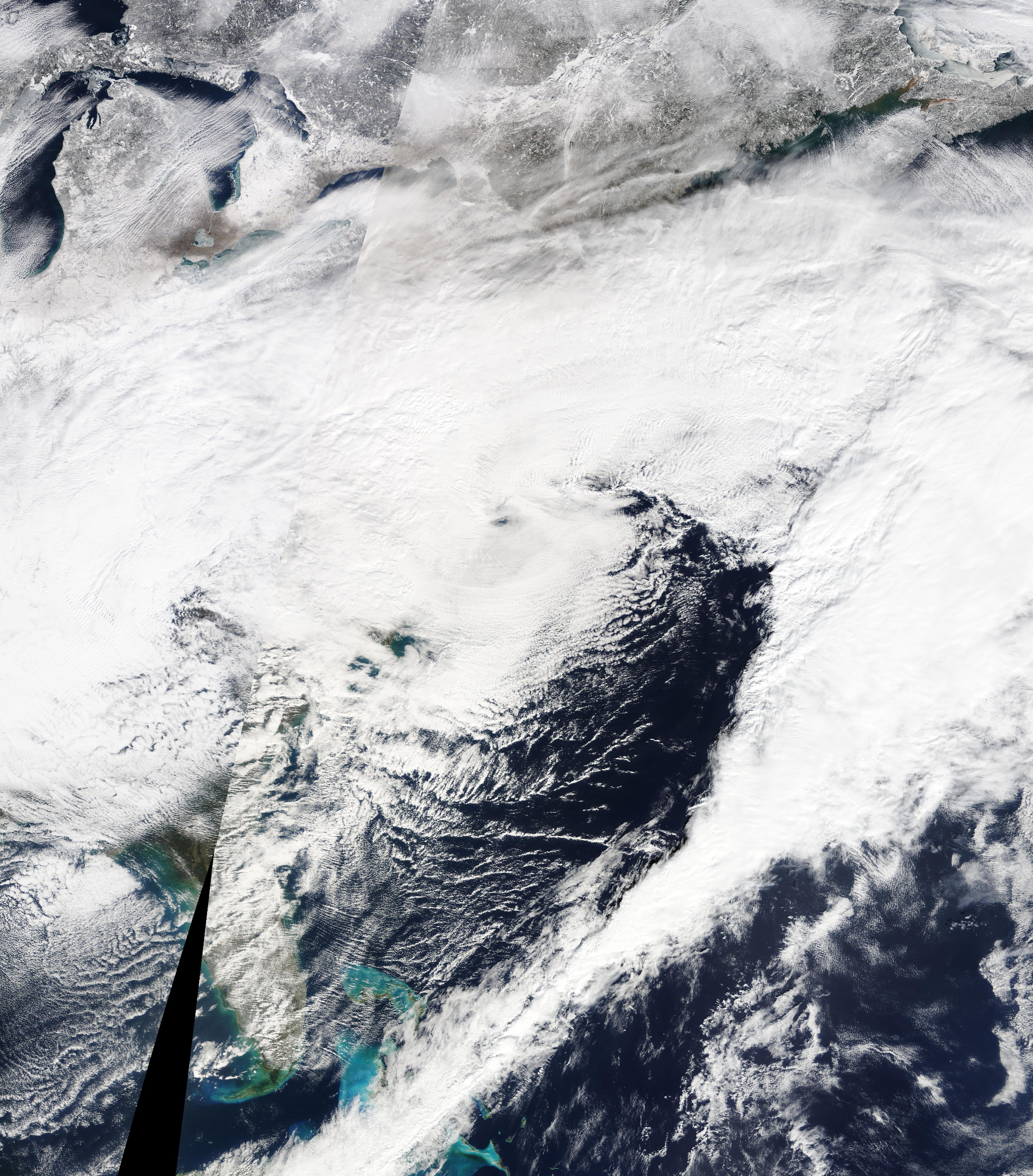
- The blizzard rapidly strengthening over the Northeastern United States early on February 6

Meteorological history
- Formed: February 1, 2010
- Exited land: February 6, 2010
- Dissipated: February 11, 2010

Category 4 "Crippling" blizzard
- Regional snowfall index: 10.15 (NOAA)
- Highest gusts: 54 mph (87 km/h) in Georgetown, Delaware
- Lowest pressure: 976 mbar (hPa); 28.82 inHg
- Max. snowfall: Snow – 38.3 inches (97 cm) at Elkridge, Maryland; Ice – 0.2 in (5.1 mm) in Pfafftown and Rural Hall, North Carolina

Overall effects
- Fatalities: 41 total
- Damage: $300 million (2010 USD)
- Areas affected: Midwest and East Coast of the United States (from Illinois to Georgia to Vermont); New Mexico, Mexico, Eastern Canada, California, Arizona
- Power outages: > 331,000
- Part of the 2009–10 North American winter

The February 5–6, 2010, North American blizzard, commonly referred to as Snowmageddon, was a blizzard that had major and widespread impact in the Northeastern United States. The storm's center tracked from Baja California Sur on February 2, 2010, to the east coast on February 6, 2010, before heading east out into the Atlantic. Effects were felt to the north and west of this track in northern Mexico, California, and the southwestern, midwestern, southeastern, and most notably Mid-Atlantic states. Severe weather, including extensive flooding and landslides in Mexico, and historic snowfall totals in every one of the Mid-Atlantic states, brought deaths to Mexico, New Mexico, Virginia, Pennsylvania, and Maryland.

Most crippling was the widespread 20 to 35 in (50 to 90 cm) of snow accumulated across southern Pennsylvania, the Eastern Panhandle of West Virginia, northern Virginia, Washington, D.C., Maryland, Delaware, and South Jersey, bringing air and interstate highway travel to a halt. Rail service south and west of Washington, D.C., was suspended, and rail travel between D.C. and Boston was available with limited service. Blizzard conditions were reported in a relatively small area of Maryland, but near-blizzard conditions occurred across much of the Mid-Atlantic region. The nor'easter reached a minimum central pressure of 976 mb while out at sea on February 7.

This event was the second of four nor'easters during the 2009–2010 winter that brought heavy snow to enough of the Northeast's population to be numerically recognized by NOAA's NESIS intensity rating. The first and third of these systems, the December 2009 Northeastern U.S. blizzard and the February 9–10, 2010 North American blizzard, respectively, combined with this event to bring the snowiest winter on record to much of the Mid-Atlantic. Additionally, this event was the second of three major Mid-Atlantic snowstorms that occurred over a 12-day period; each subsequent storm focused its heaviest snow slightly farther north: the January 30, 2010, storm (not recognized by NESIS) dropped more than a foot of snow across Virginia and the lower Chesapeake Bay region, while the February 9–10, 2010 North American blizzard bulls-eyed the Maryland-Pennsylvania border with as much as 38.3 inches.

== Meteorological history ==
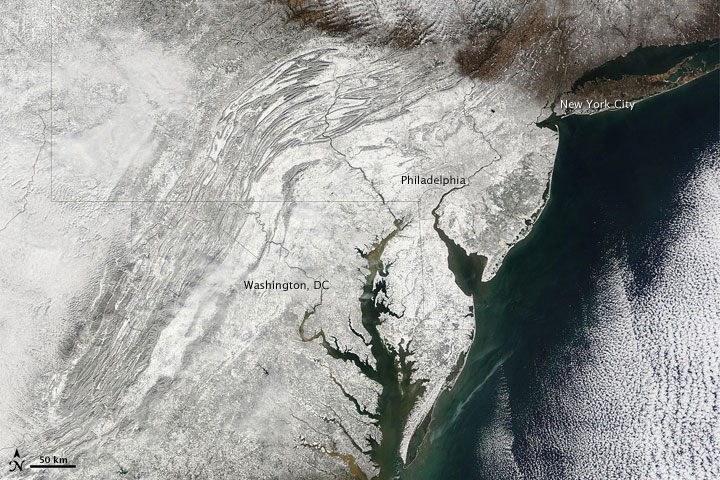
Snow-covered Mid-Atlantic region of the United States

The main storm system originated in the Pacific Ocean, bringing heavy rain and mountain snow to California and Arizona on February 2. The storm center moved east through northern Mexico on February 3. The system produced over one foot of snowfall in the higher elevations and the eastern plains of New Mexico, shutting down major highways including Interstate 40 east of Albuquerque for several hours on February 3. The storm's center then advanced across Texas to the Louisiana Gulf Coast on February 4, while dropping rain and snow in Oklahoma and northern Texas, and severe thunderstorms further south. Meanwhile, a second, more-northern disturbance tracked from the central Rockies to the lower Missouri River Valley, bringing light snow showers to Montana, the Dakotas, parts of Minnesota, Wisconsin, Iowa, and Illinois.

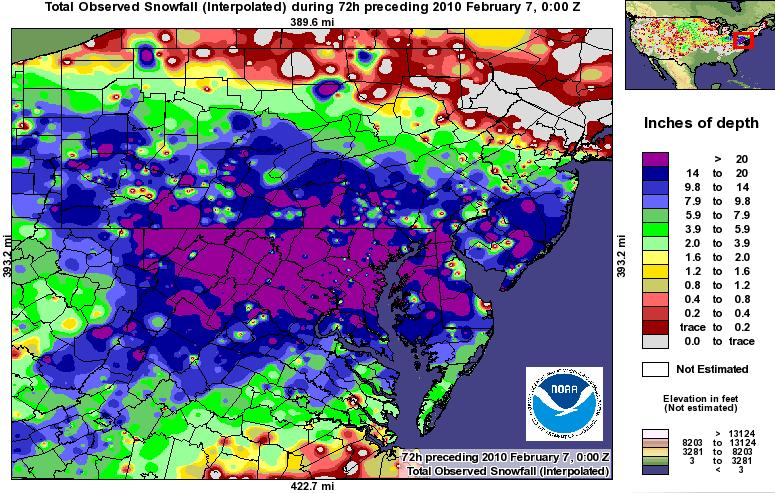
February 5–6, 2010 North American blizzard Mid Atlantic snowfall accumulation (from the National Weather Service).

On February 5, the two systems phased together, resulting in a band of heavy snow across Illinois, Indiana, Ohio, and Pennsylvania. That evening, the northern system's energy was absorbed into the main southern circulation, promoting fast intensification. Heavy snow subsequently developed over the Mid-Atlantic states as the storm's center tracked across North Carolina towards the Atlantic Coast.

NEXRAD Animation from 5 February 2010.

An antecedent and nearly-stationary upper-level ridge over the Maritime Provinces of Canada served to block the storm system from following the traditional northeast track into New England. Instead, during the AM hours of February 6th, the storm center slowed its northeasterly movement as it continued to deepen east of Virginia Beach, before it eventually was forced eastward. The blocking pattern was reflected on the storm's snowfall map by a sharp northern gradient in northern New Jersey and by the axis of heaviest snow running WNW-ESE through Maryland and Delaware (opposed to the SW-NE pattern found from most nor'easters). Only moderate accumulations reached the southern suburbs of New York City, with no more than light snow falling in the city itself. Upstate New York and New England were spared from this system, receiving little more than isolated snow flurries in southern sections. Easterly winds and onshore flow contributed to light snow accumulations of less than one inch in Boston, Cape Cod, and parts of coastal Rhode Island.

According to the blog of Weather Channel senior meteorologist Stu Ostro, the storm formed from "Miller Type B" cyclogenesis: a storm centered over the Ohio river runs into a blocking ridge and redevelops along the Carolina coast. (This differed from the North American blizzard of 2009, of "Miller Type A" cyclogenesis where a storm center develops over the eastern Gulf of Mexico and strengthens while tracking north to a latitude of greater temperature contrast.) This storm was carrying an enormous amount of moisture drawn from both the Gulf of Mexico (as seen on February 3 satellite imagery over Mexico), and from the Atlantic (as seen in radar imagery from early on February 5). Ostro characterized the storm as having "strong dynamics" and expected the snowfall to be of long duration, typically leading to large accumulations.

== Nicknames ==
Media reports emphasized the magnitude of the storm, giving rise to many nicknames for it including Snowmageddon and Snowpocalypse.

The Capital Weather Gang blog on The Washington Post website ran an online poll on February 4, 2010, asking for reader feedback prior to the blizzard, and several blogs, including the paper's own blog, followed that up by using either "Snowmageddon" and/or "Snowpocalypse" during the following days, before, during, and after the storm hit.

The Washington Post also popularized other portmanteaus, including "snOMG" (from OMG) and "kaisersnoze" (from Keyser Soze), in response to the February snowstorms.

During the evening preceding the first blizzard hitting Washington, D.C., most of the United States federal government closed, and press coverage continued to characterize the storm using either "Snowmageddon", "Snowpocalypse", or both. The phrase was later popularized by the President of the United States, Barack Obama, on February 8, 2010, who used the term while speaking at the Democratic National Committee's meeting.

== Snowfall ==
State	Greatest Measurement By State	County	Amount (in)
MD	2 miles WSW of Elkridge	Howard	38.3
VA	1 mile ENE of Howellsville	Warren	37
WV	2 miles WNW of Lehew	Hampshire	34
PA	Upper Strasburg	Franklin	31
NJ	National Park	Gloucester	28.5
DC	Dalecarlia Reservoir	Northwest	28.0
DE	Wilmington	New Castle	26.5

An unofficial storm total snowfall observation of 39.0" was made from Riverwood, MD (in Frederick County) on CoCoRaHS, and later referenced in the February 2010 Washington Baltimore Climate Review (not published electronically). However NOAA/NWS products list the 38.3" total at 2WSW Elkridge, MD as the "storm's greatest (so far)".

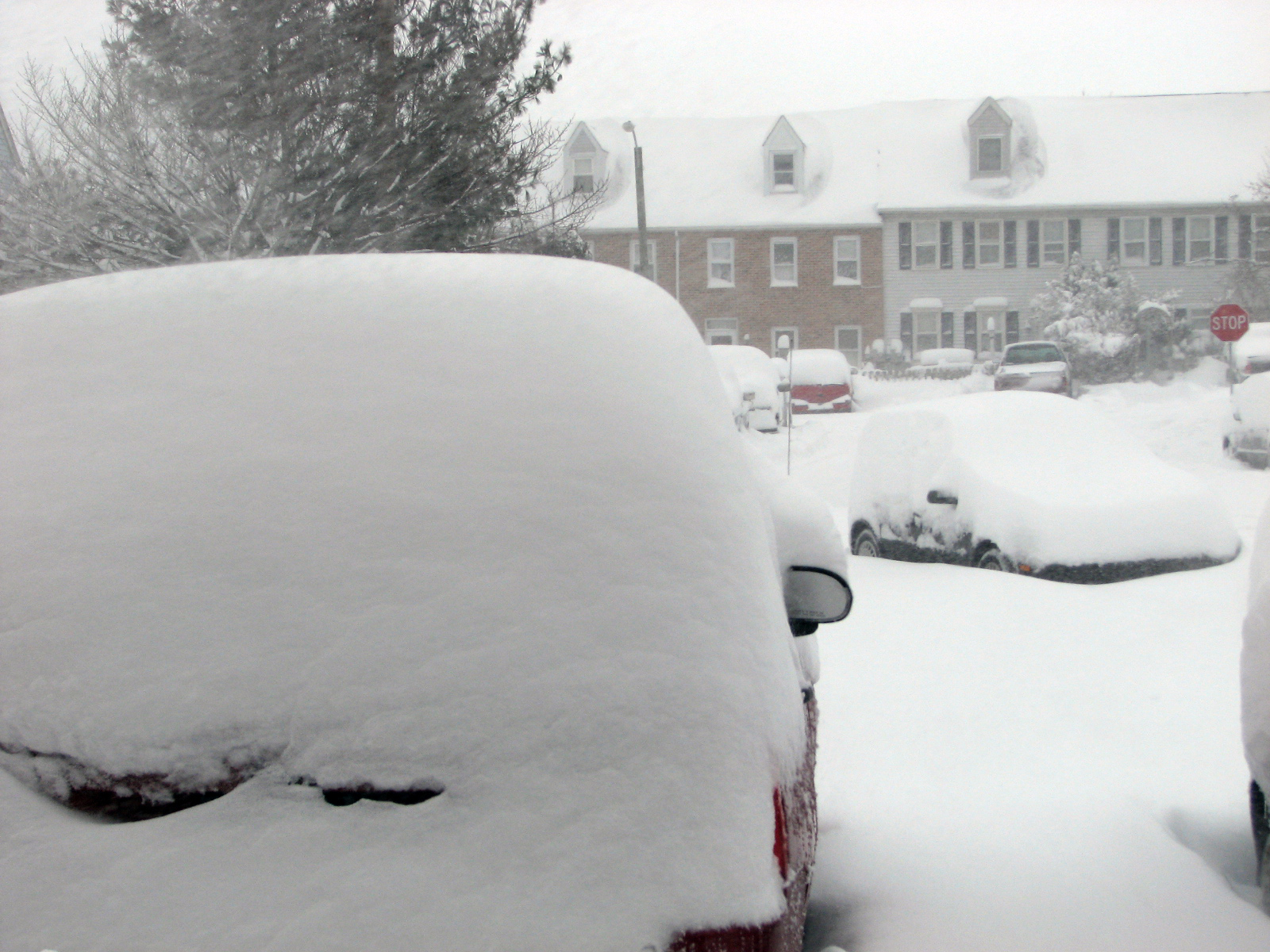
In Ephrata, Pennsylvania, 16 inches (41 cm) of snow had fallen by 8:30 am EST on February 6

State	Official Observation Sites	County	Amount (in)
MD	Frostburg	Allegany	36.0
VA	Washington Dulles International Airport	Loudoun	32.9
PA	Somerset	Somerset	30
MD	2 miles W of Rockville	Montgomery	29.2
PA	Philadelphia International Airport	Philadelphia	28.5
VA	Vienna	Fairfax	26
DE	New Castle Airport	New Castle	25.8
MD	Baltimore/Washington International Airport	Anne Arundel	25
NJ	Cape May	Cape May	21.8
PA	Pittsburgh International Airport	Allegheny	21.1
NJ	Hammonton	Atlantic	21
NJ	Atlantic City International Airport	Atlantic	18.2
PA	Harrisburg International Airport	Dauphin	18
VA	Ronald Reagan Washington National Airport	Arlington	17.8
PA	State College	Centre	14
PA	Lehigh Valley International Airport	Lehigh	7.7
NY	[Throughout Staten Island]	Richmond	1–5
NY	Central Park	New York	Trace

Pittsburgh with 21.1", was the first major city to experience the storm's heavier snowfall, separating sub-20" amounts over Indiana and Ohio from 20 to 35" readings found in the Laurel Highlands and east. This was Pittsburgh's 4th greatest snow event since records began in 1871. Areas south of Pittsburgh received up to 26" of snowfall. Although initially forecast to bring only 4–8" of snow to the area, the storm's track farther to the north lead to the explosive accumulations. The National Weather Service in Pittsburgh office recorded 7" of snow over 700P-1159P February 5 and 5.3" over 300A-600A on February 6.

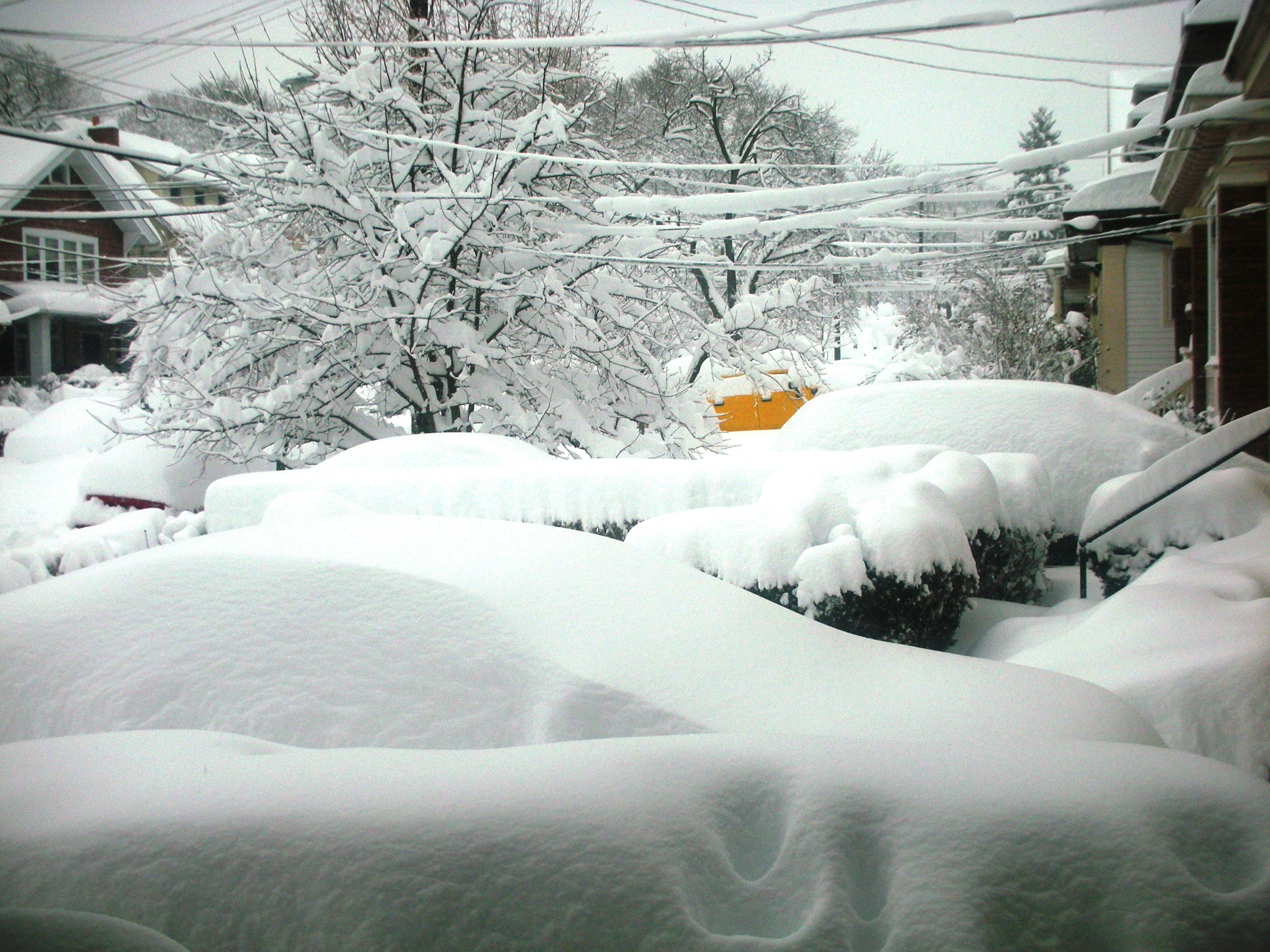
In Pittsburgh, over 20 inches (51 cm) of snow fell causing numerous powerlines and tree branches to buckle.

The swath of heaviest snowfall then crossed the Appalachians and squeezed between Washington, D.C., and Baltimore. The District of Columbia's totals were generally near 20", ranging from 18 to 28". Baltimore City's totals were around 25", ranging from 21 to 28". Dulles

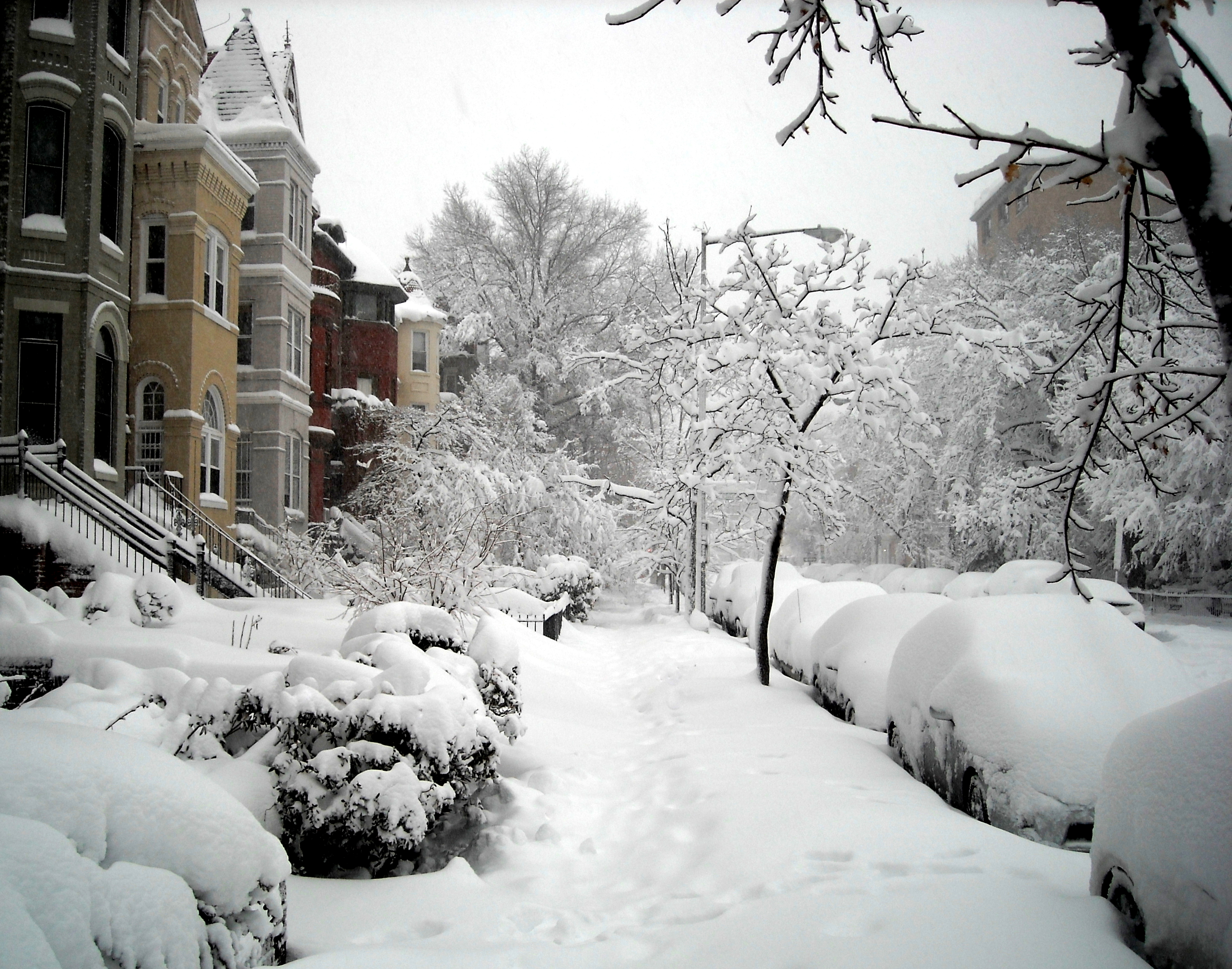
19th Street in Dupont Circle, Washington, D.C., Northwest, where ~24" of snow had fallen on February 6th by day's end.

International Airport's 32.9" set all-time records (since 1962) for most 2-day and 3-day snowfall, shattering the old records from the Blizzard of 1996 of 23.2" and 24.6", respectively. Dulles received 17.5" on February 6, however, making the day's total only the 3rd greatest 24-hour snowfall amount. Baltimore Washington International Airport, despite being near numerous 30"+ reports, saw a relatively tame 25". This 2-day total was 2nd greatest (since 1892), behind 26.3" from the 1922 Knickerbocker Storm. Reagan National Airport's 17.8" was one of the metro region's lowest, but still ranked as Washington's 4th greatest (since 1871) in both 2-day and 3-day totals.

Additional local reports from Maryland include: Edgemere, 35.4"; Clarksville, 34.9"; Crofton, 34.0"; Columbia, 33.8"; Laurel, 32.9"; Pasadena, 31.0"; Dundalk, 30.5"; Ellicott City, 30.2"; Frederick, 29.0"; Olney, 28.0"; Germantown, 27.4"; and Catonsville, 22.9".

Philadelphia's 28.5" ranked the storm as the city's 2nd greatest on record (since 1872), falling not far behind the Blizzard of 1996's 30.7". This made for Philadelphia's first winter with multiple 20"+ storms, following the 23.2" from the North American blizzard of 2009. Wilmington, DE's 25.8" was their greatest storm total of all-time (since 1894), passing the 1996 storm's 22". In February 2021, the National Centers for Environmental Information announced that the official Delaware snow depth record was established near Greenwood on February 7, 2010, after the February 5–6, 2010 North American blizzard resulted in a measurement of 28 inches. The record was measured at the Greenwood 2.9 SE station of the Community Collaborative Rain, Hail and Snow Network.

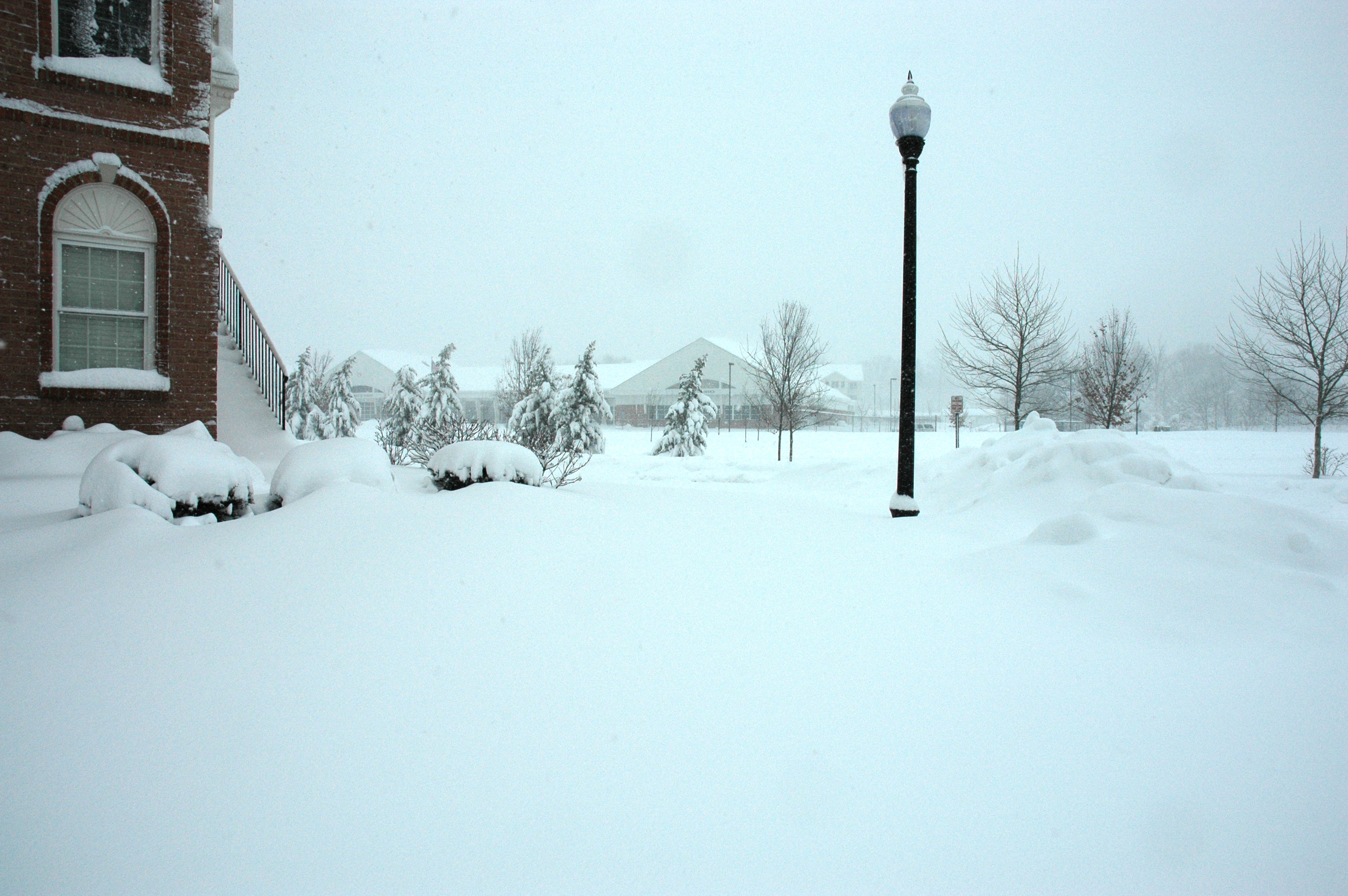
Full force of storm in community of South Riding, Virginia, on February 6. View is facing east toward Route 606, Loudoun County Parkway.

State	County/City Averaging > 24"	Range	Greatest Report	(in)
VA	Clarke	31–33"	Berryville	32
MD	Allegany	26–36"	Frostburg	36
MD	Howard	25–38"	2 miles WSW of Elkridge	38.3
VA	Frederick/Winchester	25–32"	3 miles WSW of Armel	31.5
VA	Loudoun	22–35"	Leesburg	34
MD	Frederick	24–34"	Riverwood?	37–39?
MD	Montgomery	21–34"	West Laurel	33.5
MD	Baltimore County	22–32"	Randallstown	32
VA	Fauquier	16–33"	Marshall	32
MD	Anne Arundel	18–34"	Crofton	34
MD	Carroll	22–29"	Eldersburg	29.1
MD	Baltimore City	21–28"	Pimlico	28
MD	Harford	23–29"	Norrisville	29
MD	Washington	22–32"	3 miles ENE of Hancock	31.5
VA	Prince William/Manassas	22–32"	5 miles NNE of Antioch	32

South Jersey saw as much as 29" of snow; Vineland reported 19.8". In South Central Pennsylvania, the areas of Harrisburg, Lancaster and York reported receiving over 18" of snow.

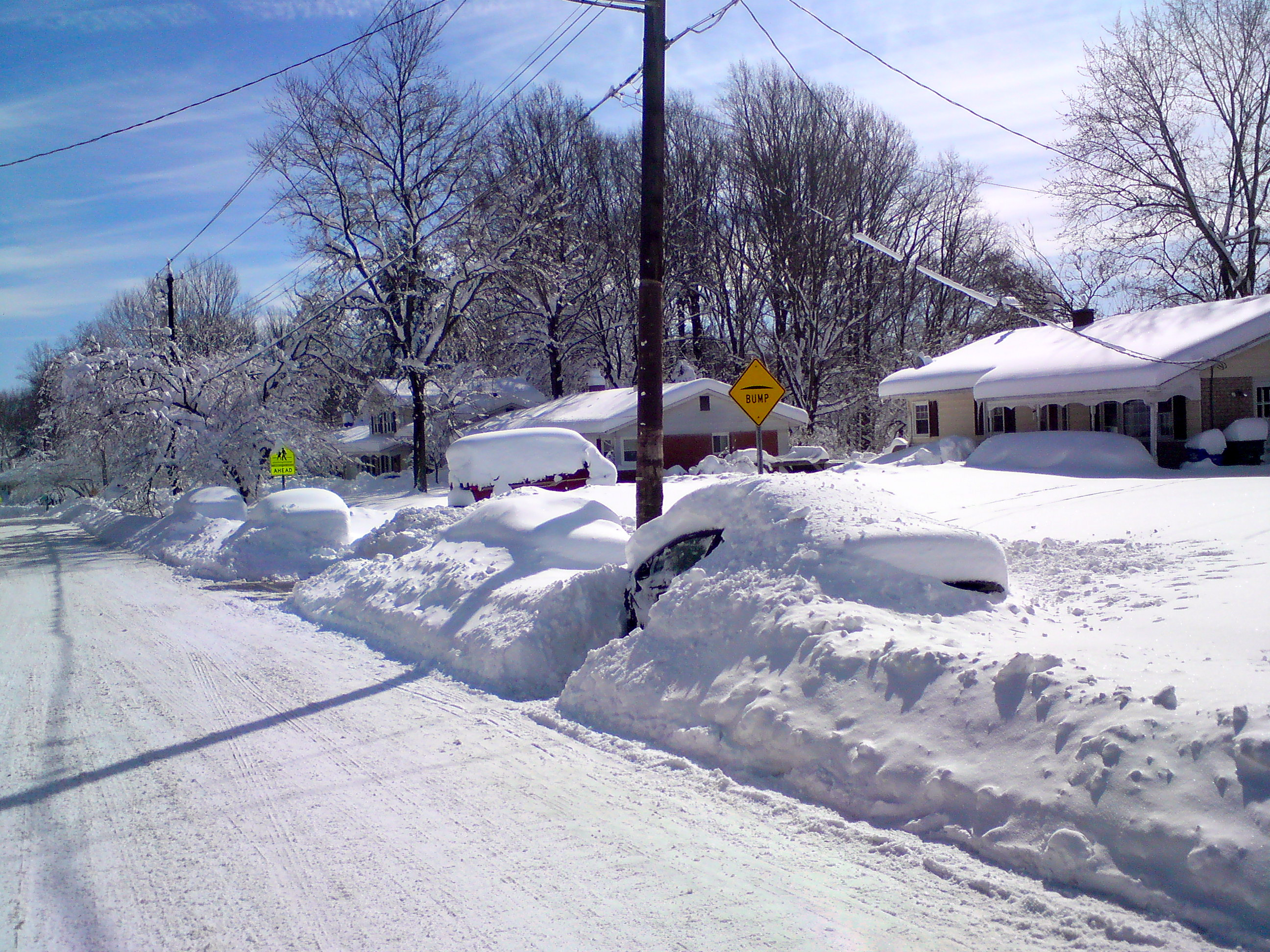
In Rockville, Maryland, cars were buried under 28 inches (71 cm) of snowfall on February 7

Many counties, including the rural areas across the Appalachian mountains and Delmarva averaged over two feet of snow.

The storm was well spotted by the winter storm reconnaissance (WSR) program at National Center of Environmental Predictions (NCEP). Two aircraft missions were deployed over the Pacific regions on February 1, 2010. Accurate measurement in the cloudy regions were taken, the data were assimilated by the global forecast models in different numerical forecast prediction centers.

The WSR program is led by Dr. Yucheng Song from the National Centers for Environmental Prediction (NCEP).

Source: CoCoRaHS

Source: NWS Washington/Baltimore Public Information Statement & Maps

Source: NWS Philadelphia/Mt. Holly Public Information Statement & Map

Source: NWS State College, PA Public Information Statement & Maps

== Impact ==
=== Mexico ===
Freak winter rains across Mexico collapsed hillsides, sent rivers over their banks and left at least 15 people dead, officials said on Friday, February 5. The rain, which began early in the week and peaked on Thursday, February 4, had relented by Friday morning, providing officials with their first good look at the damage. More than half of the country was affected. The hardest area hit by the storm was the western state of Michoacán, a famous reserve for monarch butterflies, where at least 13 people were killed by landslides and flooding. An unknown number of people were missing Friday. Other areas that were hard hit by flooding was the eastern Mexico City borough of Iztapalapa and municipalities in eastern State of Mexico such as Ciudad Nezahualcóyotl and Ecatepec de Morelos. The rain broke records for February in Michoacán, the State of Mexico and Mexico City, with twice the normal amount for the entire month falling in 24 hours. There was a silver lining: Officials said the copious rain had filled reservoirs outside Mexico City that are a key source of water for the metropolis. Water shortages had forced on-and-off rationing since last summer. Water authorities state that most of the country now has a "positive balance" in reservoirs with 21,000,000 cubic metres (5.5×10^{9} US gal) of water added to reservoirs.

=== United States ===
==== Southwest ====
The storm affected Arizona and New Mexico from February 1 to 4. Up to 1 foot (0.30 m) of snow fell in the mountains east of Albuquerque, New Mexico, while snow accumulations in the city varied from less than 1 inch (2.5 cm) near downtown to 5 inches (13 cm) on the West Mesa and in the far northeast foothills. Ice-covered roadways caused numerous accidents – including one fatal crash near Gallup – shutting down Interstate 40 through Tijeras Canyon and between Grants and Gallup for several hours on February 3.

==== Deep South ====
Prolonged rains from Thursday morning through Thursday evening (February 4), produced widespread rainfall totals of 1 inch (2.5 cm) – 4 inches (10 cm) statewide with flooding reported in portions of Central and Southern Mississippi. The capital city of Jackson broke a daily rainfall record with 2.51 inches (6.4 cm) of rainfall. Power outages were reported in North Carolina's mountain counties as the winter storm brought a mixture of snow, sleet and freezing rain to much of the state and rain to the rest, with about 40,000 outages late Friday afternoon (5 February). A drenching rain fell early Friday in the Charlotte and Atlanta area and then transitioned to a few inches of snow later in the day, while several inches of snow accumulated farther north. Parts of central and eastern North Carolina were under flood watches in advance of significant rainfall of up to 2 inches (5.1 cm).

==== Midwest ====
Heavy snowfall occurred in Illinois, Indiana, and Ohio February 4–6. Snowfall totals ranged from 6 inches (15 cm) to over 1 foot (0.30 m) across the region. Drifts of up to 4 feet (1.2 m) were reported in central Indiana.

The heavy snow, ice storms and low temperatures of January the 26th led to Interstate 90 being closed from Chamberlain, South Dakota, to the Minnesota border. On the nightfall on Monday, Interstate 29 was closed from Sioux Falls to the North Dakota border. Power company officials estimated that about 7,600 customers in South Dakota and 100 in North Dakota did not have power on Monday. Some phone systems also experienced brief telecommunications outages. Kristi Truman, director of the North Dakota Office of Emergency Management was concerned about failing water and power supplies.

In the Dakotas a number of Indian Reservations were left without power or running water.

"There's been winters this bad before, but not with rain so bad it freezes the power lines and snaps the poles", said Joseph Brings Plenty, the 38-year-old chairman of the Cheyenne River Sioux tribe.

Power outages began with a storm in December knocking down around 5,000 power poles, and was accelerated by an ice storm Jan. 22 knocking down another 3,000 power lines on the reservation.

Among the tribes of South Dakota who suffered from the multiple storms were Cheyenne River Sioux, Crow Creek Sioux Tribe, Flandreau-Santee Sioux Tribe, Lower Brule Sioux Tribe, Rosebud Sioux Tribe, Sisseton-Wahpeton Oyate and Standing Rock Sioux Tribe.

The Episcopal Church stepped in to help the reservations residents survive the winter.

On February 1, utility crews worked overtime to get power back to the 14,000 residents of Cheyenne River Sioux Reservation. The wind chill factor averaged about 25 °F below zero and there was about 1 foot of snow on average.

Power outages in both the Dakotas power covered only 100 rural electric customers and minimal numbers in Bismarck, North Dakota by February, 5.

==== Mid-Atlantic ====
The United States Government implemented an unscheduled leave policy for federal employees on Friday February 5 and shut down four hours early in an effort to clear metropolitan Washington before substantial snow accumulations began. Numerous school districts in the Washington metropolitan area announced closures for Friday February 5 well in advance, although District of Columbia Public Schools and some Maryland schools held a half day of class. Many districts had used all their built-in snow days and some began scheduling classes on upcoming holidays, such as Fairfax County, Virginia, on February 15, the Monday of President's Day weekend. Late on Sunday February 7, the Office of Personnel Management announced that the United States Government would again be closed on Monday February 8, with only emergency/essential personnel required to report, and numerous school districts again canceled classes between February 9–11.

As of shortly after midnight on February 6, more than 50,000 homes and businesses in the Washington, D.C., metropolitan area were without electricity. In northern Virginia, the total was 33,000 and in northern Maryland and the District of Columbia the total was 19,000. Roadways were blanketed with snow, Metro bus service ended at 9 pm EST, and above ground Metro rail service had also ended. Flights were canceled at the Washington-Baltimore area's three main airports and at Philadelphia International Airport. Delta Air Lines had suspended flights in and out of Washington, Baltimore, and Philadelphia. A Washington Wizards game was postponed due to the storm.

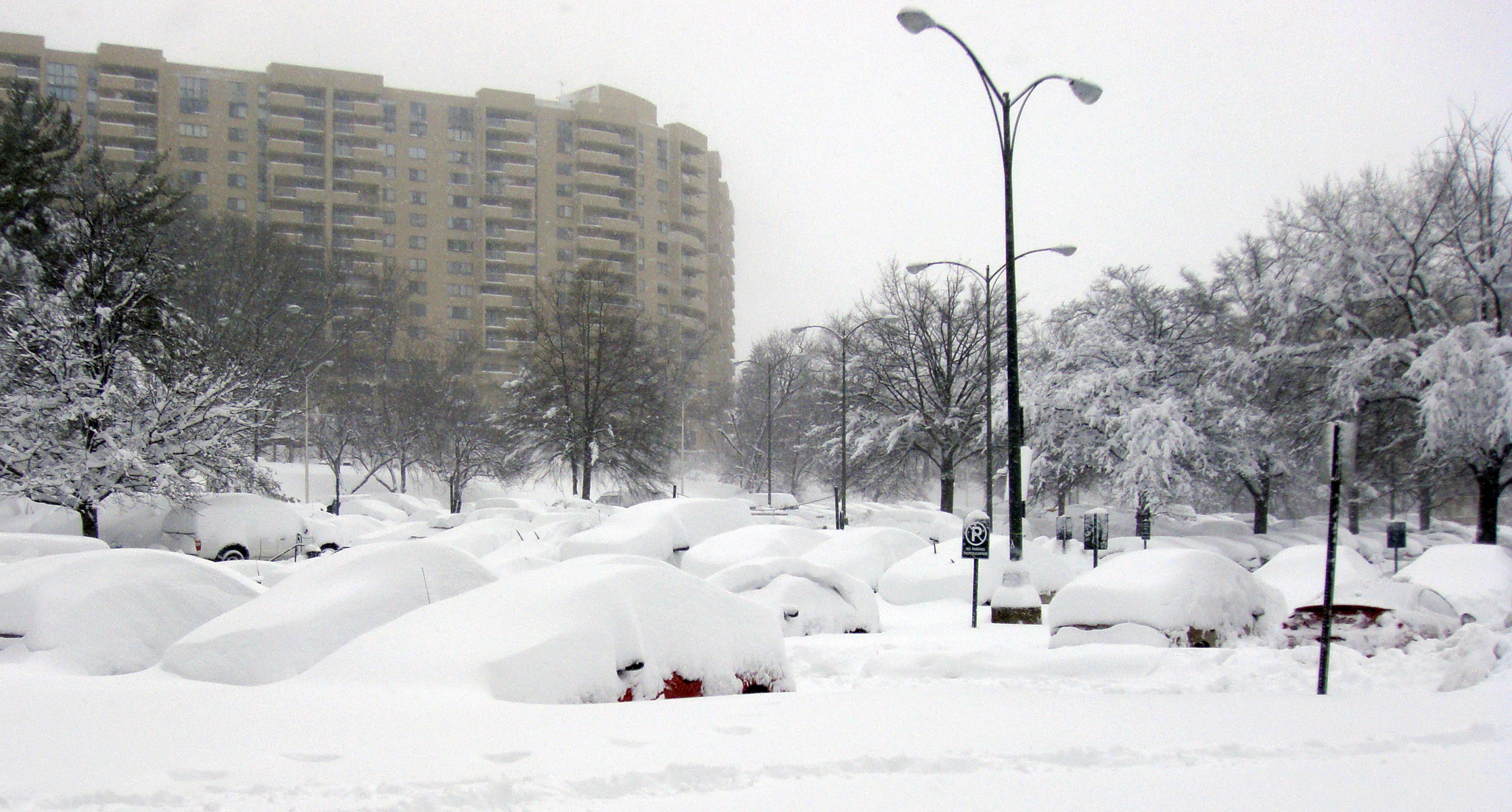
Cars covered by snow near the end of the blizzard, Pentagon City, Arlington, Virginia

In Maryland, the Maryland Transit Administration ran special snow trains on its heavy rail and light rail lines to keep tracks clear. Delaware Gov. Jack Markell declared a state of emergency Friday night and ordered all vehicles off the roads by 10 p.m. EST (this was in addition to an earlier state of emergency declared by Virginia Gov. Bob McDonnell and snow emergencies declared in the District of Columbia and some Maryland counties). Maryland was under a state of emergency as of mid-day on February 6, as state and county road crews said they were struggling to keep even one lane open on major roads and 151,000 customers were without power in Maryland, including 34,000 Baltimore Gas and Electric Co. customers in the region. Cars were left abandoned on highways, trees came down and Humvees were used to ferry patients to local hospitals. The United States Postal Service decided to cancel mail delivery and collection in the affected areas for Saturday, February 6.

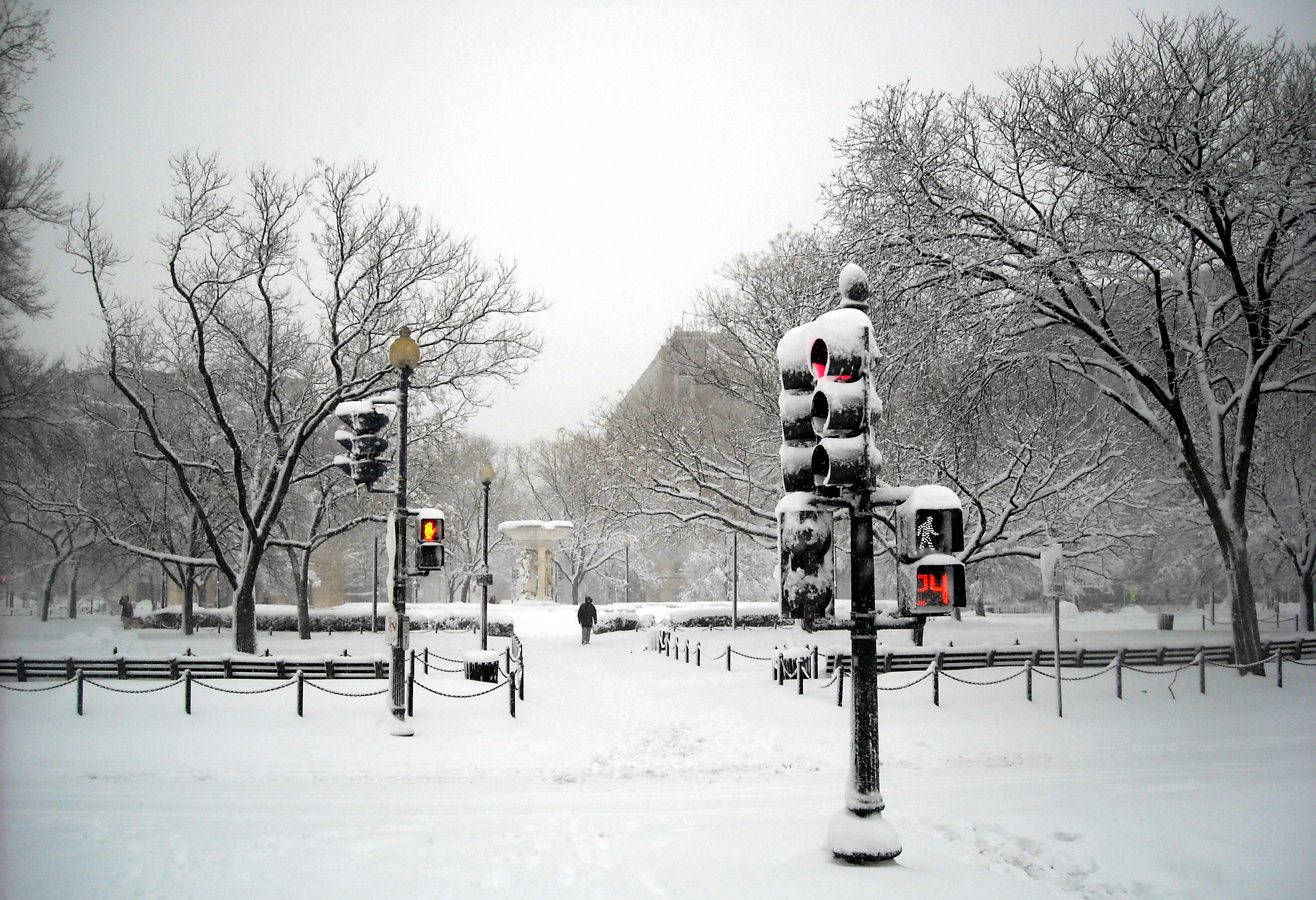
The park located in the center of Dupont Circle, Washington, D.C.

The weight of the snow caused several roof collapses throughout the Washington area. Most notably, the roof of a hangar housing private jets at Dulles International Airport caved in twice due to the snowfall. Also reported were the collapse of a house roof in Northeast, Washington, D.C., a house in the Luxmanor Area in Rockville, Maryland, which collapsed from a fire that resulted from trying to melt the snow from the roof, the entire Prince William Ice Center in Dale City, Virginia, and the total collapse of a warehouse in California, Maryland. In none of the four cases were there reports of injuries. Around 2 pm EST on February 6, DC fire and EMS personnel responded to a church collapse in Northeast DC–preliminary reports from the scene were that the weight of the heavy snow caused the 1- or 1 1/2-story wooden building to completely collapse, and subsequent gas leaks caused some neighbors to be evacuated. The roof of St. John's School in Hollywood, Maryland, also collapsed, as did the roof of the truck bay at the volunteer fire station in Bailey's Crossroads, Virginia, on the morning of Monday February 8, but there were no injuries.

Amtrak shut down much of their service in the region, canceling its Silver Meteor, Silver Star, Crescent, Carolinian, Palmetto, and Capitol Limited, as well as canceling Cardinal service past Huntington, West Virginia However services north continued to operate through the teeth of the storm on a limited schedule.

In Pittsburgh, both the impact and severity of the storm caught many by surprise. Snow began falling in earnest late Friday morning. The sudden onset of the storm forced many local school districts, especially districts south of the city, to close early due to rapidly deteriorating road conditions; this is an extremely uncommon event for schools in southwestern Pennsylvania. Nearly all schools, including the Pittsburgh Public Schools, cancelled classes the following week. Most local universities were also forced to cancel classes for much of the following week due to the storm's effects. Additionally, over 130,000 people in the Pittsburgh area were without power as a result of the heavy, wet snow. For many residents, power was not restored until Monday, February 15.

== Notable events ==
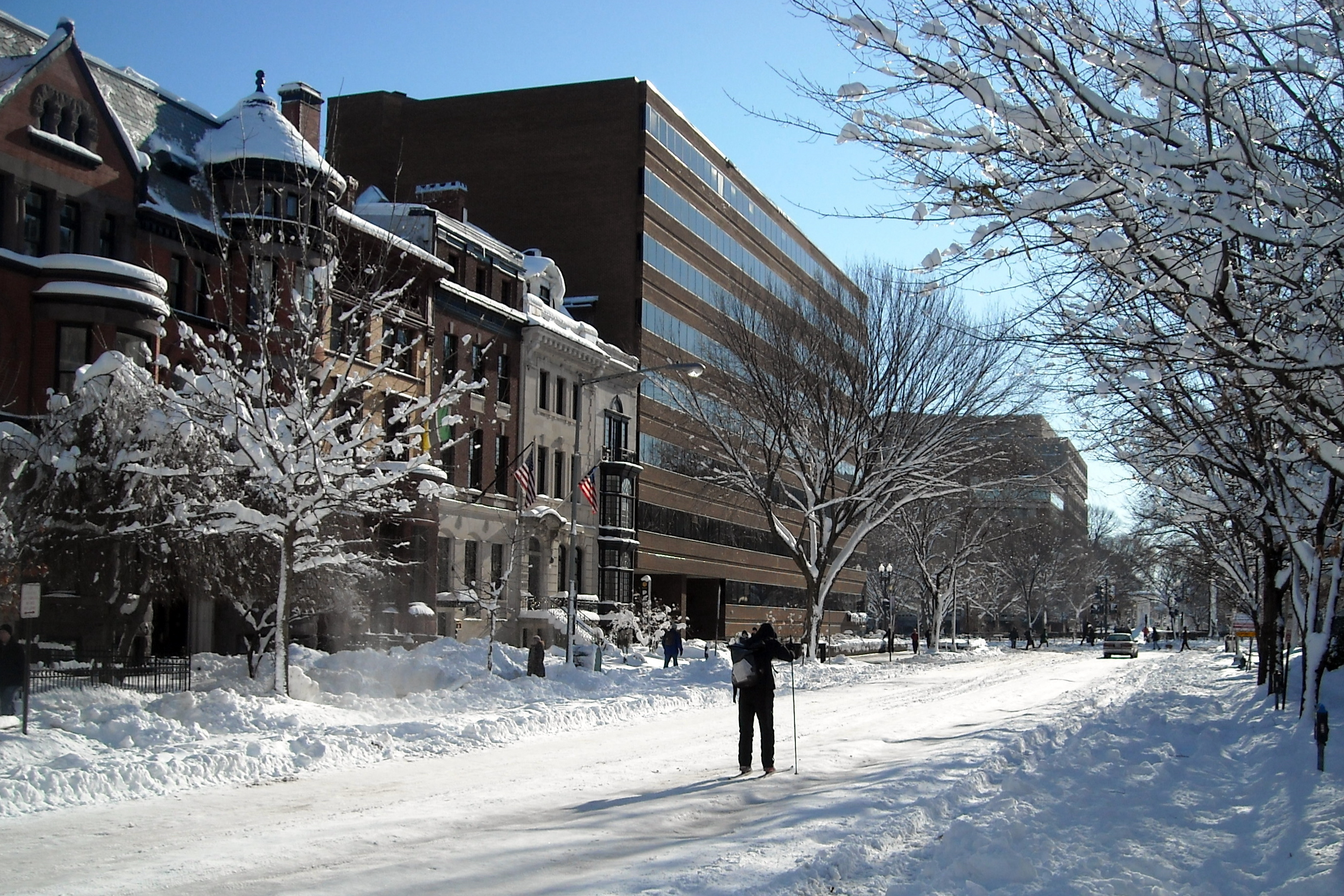
A cross-country skier on New Hampshire Avenue in Washington, D.C.

=== Washington, D.C. ===
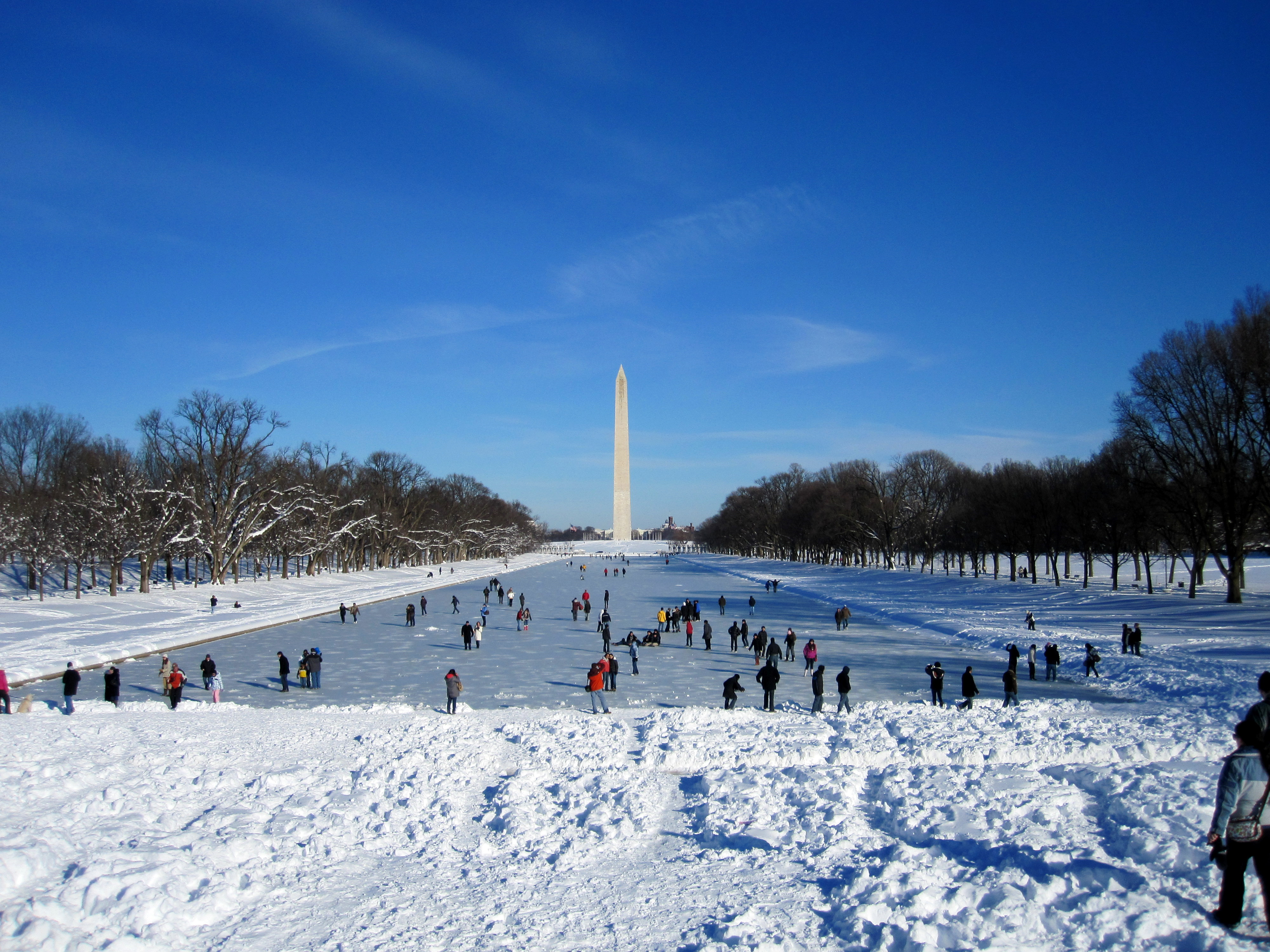
The Lincoln Memorial Reflecting Pool in Washington, D.C., froze over during the blizzard, with the ice being strong enough to walk on.

Several cross-country skiers were spotted throughout Washington, D.C., during the blizzard. Photographs of two skiers were shown in several regional newspapers, making them an iconic image of the storm and local celebrities. More than 2,000 people joined a snowball fight in Dupont Circle which had been organized on Facebook. This event marked the founding of the Washington DC Snowball Fight Association.

== Casualties ==
=== Mexico ===
Three children died when their home in Angangueo was overwhelmed by a flooded river, and two other people died under a landslide in Zitácuaro. A sixth victim was crushed beneath a collapsed wall of a home in Ocampo. Two children drowned trying to cross the swollen Chapulin River in the central state of Guanajuato. In total, twenty eight deaths in the states of Michoacán, Mexico State and the Distrito Federal (Mexico City) have been attributed to the storm.

=== United States ===
==== New Mexico ====
On February 3, 2010, a family from California was traveling east on snow-covered Interstate 40 near Gallup, New Mexico, when the driver hit a patch of ice, sending their pickup truck across the median into the westbound lanes, striking an oncoming vehicle, killing the adult passenger, and leaving the driver, the child, and the driver of the westbound vehicle critically injured.

==== Indiana ====
On February 5, 2010, Brendan Burke, son of Toronto Maple Leafs General Manager Brian Burke, was killed while driving in Economy, Indiana, near the Ohio border. While driving in heavy snow, his 2004 Jeep Grand Cherokee slid sideways into the path of an oncoming Ford truck, killing him and his passenger, Mark Reedy (18) of Bloomfield Hills, Michigan.

==== Virginia ====
On February 6, 2010, a father and son were hugging a tree to the occupants of a disabled vehicle on Interstate 81 in Virginia. A tractor trailer that was approaching the scene jackknifed and killed the men.

==== Maryland ====
In Maryland, a family was traveling north of Aberdeen on Route 462 when they ran into the back of a snow plow. Maryland State Police said that the accident was serious. In Bladensburg, two men were found dead in a running car whose tailpipe was blocked by snow; they died of carbon monoxide poisoning.

==== Delaware ====
In Delaware, officials investigated 8 deaths in New Castle County related to the storm. Two men were found under snow piles and a third suffered from dementia and wandered outside only to be found an hour later by a family member half buried in snow.

==== Pennsylvania ====
A father and daughter in McKeesport were killed by carbon monoxide poisoning, as a result of improper usage of a generator after a power outage. A Canonsburg man was found dead at the bottom of a snow-covered staircase. Twenty five vehicles were involved in two separate pileups on Interstate 80, killing one and injuring eighteen. Two were killed in Lancaster when their snowmobile was struck at an intersection.

== Visualization ==
Visualization based on a GEOS-5 model from February 2010, showing the massive blizzard known as "Snowmaggedon." Notice the distinctive comma-shaped cloud pattern, a common feature of blizzards, that is visible throughout the visualization.

As Snowmaggedon dumped large amounts of snow to the north, the same model run shows the storm system's tail passing over Florida and Cuba.

Animation showing total accumulated precipitation difference map from December 1, 2009, to February 28, 2010, minus December 1, 1999, to February 28, 2000. The resulting difference map shows the areas that received more precipitation in shades of green, and areas that received less precipitation in shades of brown. (NOTE: The information shown here is obtained from model output and should not be confused with observed measurements.)

The science of falling snow, how NASA observes snow from space, and the factors that lead to the 2010 "Snowmageddon."

== See also ==
- List of Regional Snowfall Index Category 4 winter storms
- February 25–27, 2010 North American blizzard
- February 9–10, 2010 North American blizzard
- March 2010 North American winter storm
- December 2009 North American blizzard
- January 2016 United States blizzard
- Winter storms of 2009–2010
