= December 2009 North American blizzard =

Weather event in the United States and Canada

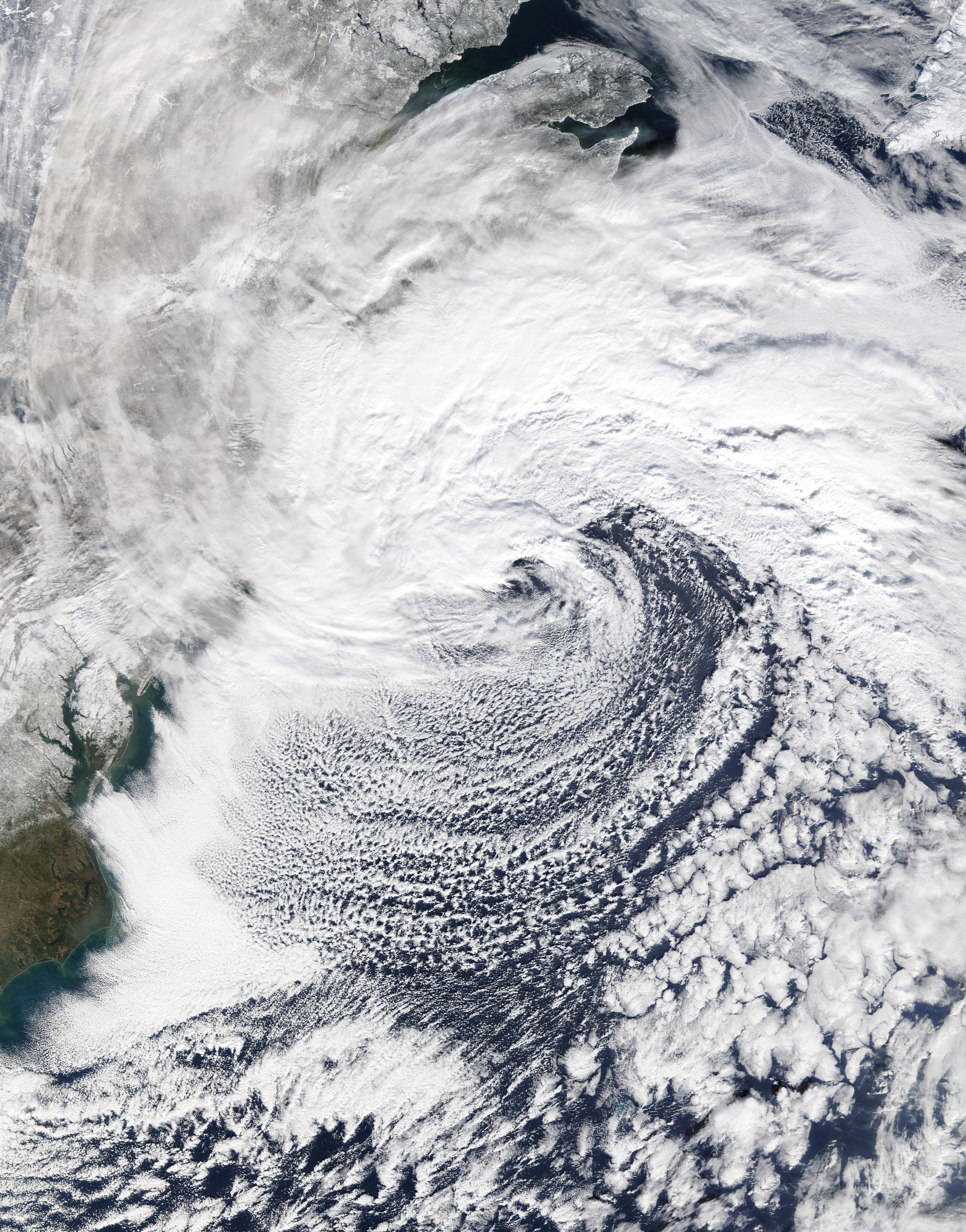
- MODIS imagery of the nor'easter on December 20 near the Mid-Atlantic states.

Meteorological history
- Formed: December 16, 2009
- Dissipated: December 20, 2009

Category 4 "Crippling" blizzard
- Regional snowfall index: 12.78 (NOAA)
- Lowest pressure: 968 millibars (28.6 inHg)
- Maximum snowfall or ice accretion: 26.3 inches (67 cm)

Tornado outbreak
- Tornadoes: 4
- Maximum rating: EF0 tornado

Overall effects
- Fatalities: 7
- Areas affected: East Coast of the United States (from North Carolina to Maine); Canadian Atlantic provinces (portions of Nova Scotia, Newfoundland, Labrador)
- Part of the 2009–10 North American winter

The December 2009 North American blizzard was a powerful nor'easter that formed over the Gulf of Mexico in December 2009, and became a major snowstorm that affected the East Coast of the United States and Canadian Atlantic provinces. The snowstorm brought record-breaking December snowfall totals to Washington, D.C., Baltimore, and Philadelphia.

The blizzard disrupted several regions, and in some areas the snowfall rate prevented snow plows from maintaining the roads. The blizzard caused flights and trains to be canceled, and left areas without power. Kentucky, Maryland, Virginia, West Virginia, and New Castle and Kent counties in Delaware declared a state of emergency. Seven deaths were reported to have been caused by the storm.

== Meteorological history ==
On December 16, 2009, meteorologists identified a storm forming in the Gulf of Mexico. It produced record rainfall in regions of Texas and had the potential to strengthen as it moved through Georgia and Florida and further north. Weather models accurately predicted that this storm would meet with cold air while retaining its heavy precipitation. By the afternoon of December 19, the large, low pressure region had moved off the East Coast, intensifying and bringing heavy snow to the major Mid-Atlantic cities. Blizzard warnings were issued in Washington, D.C., Baltimore, and Long Island. As the storm moved northward along the East coast, at one point it measured 500 miles (800 km) across 14 states. The storm produced whiteout conditions and dumped about 16–20 inches (41–51 cm) of snow in major cities along the Eastern seaboard.

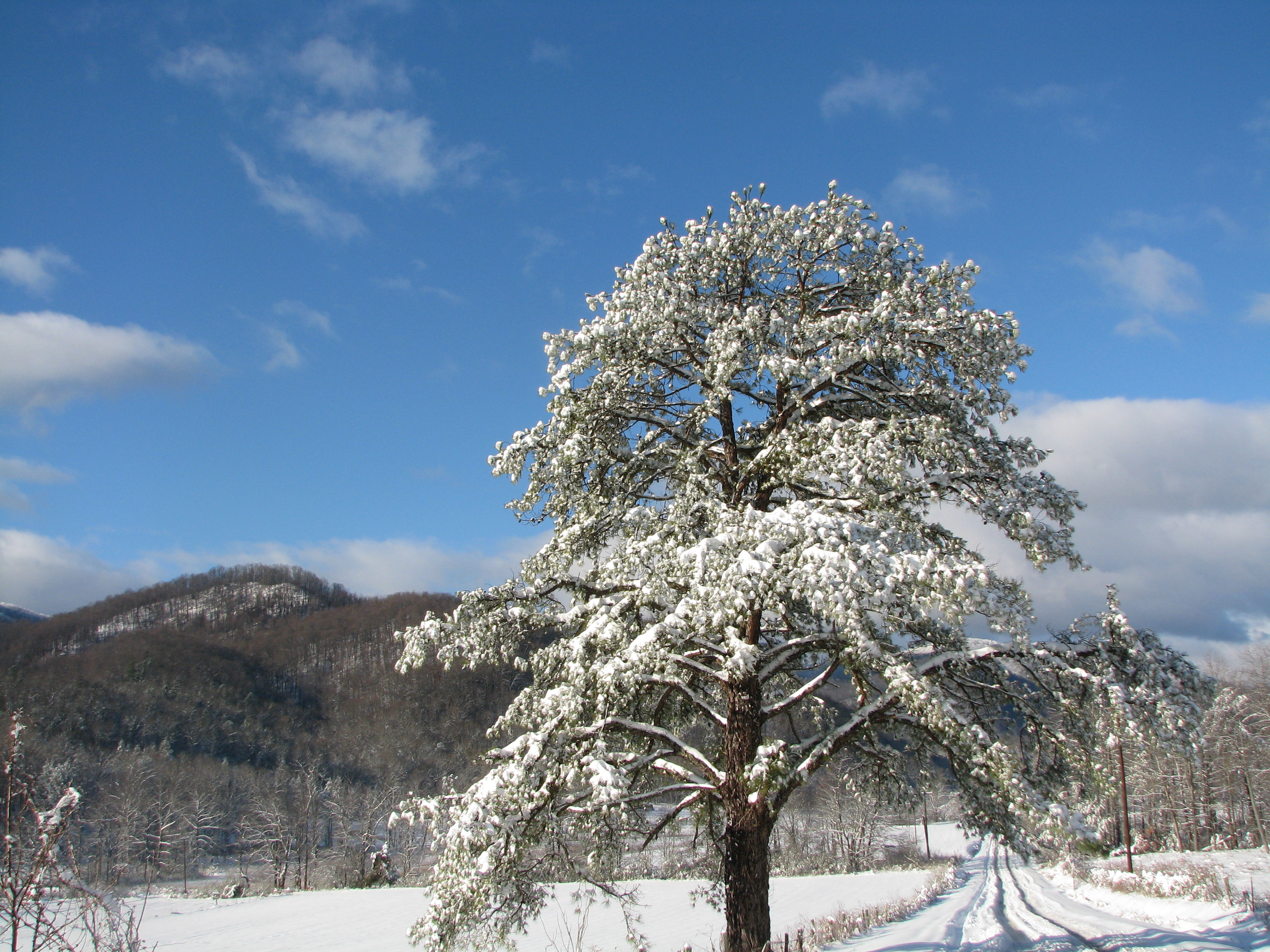
After the blizzard in Old Fort, North Carolina. A foot of snow fell.

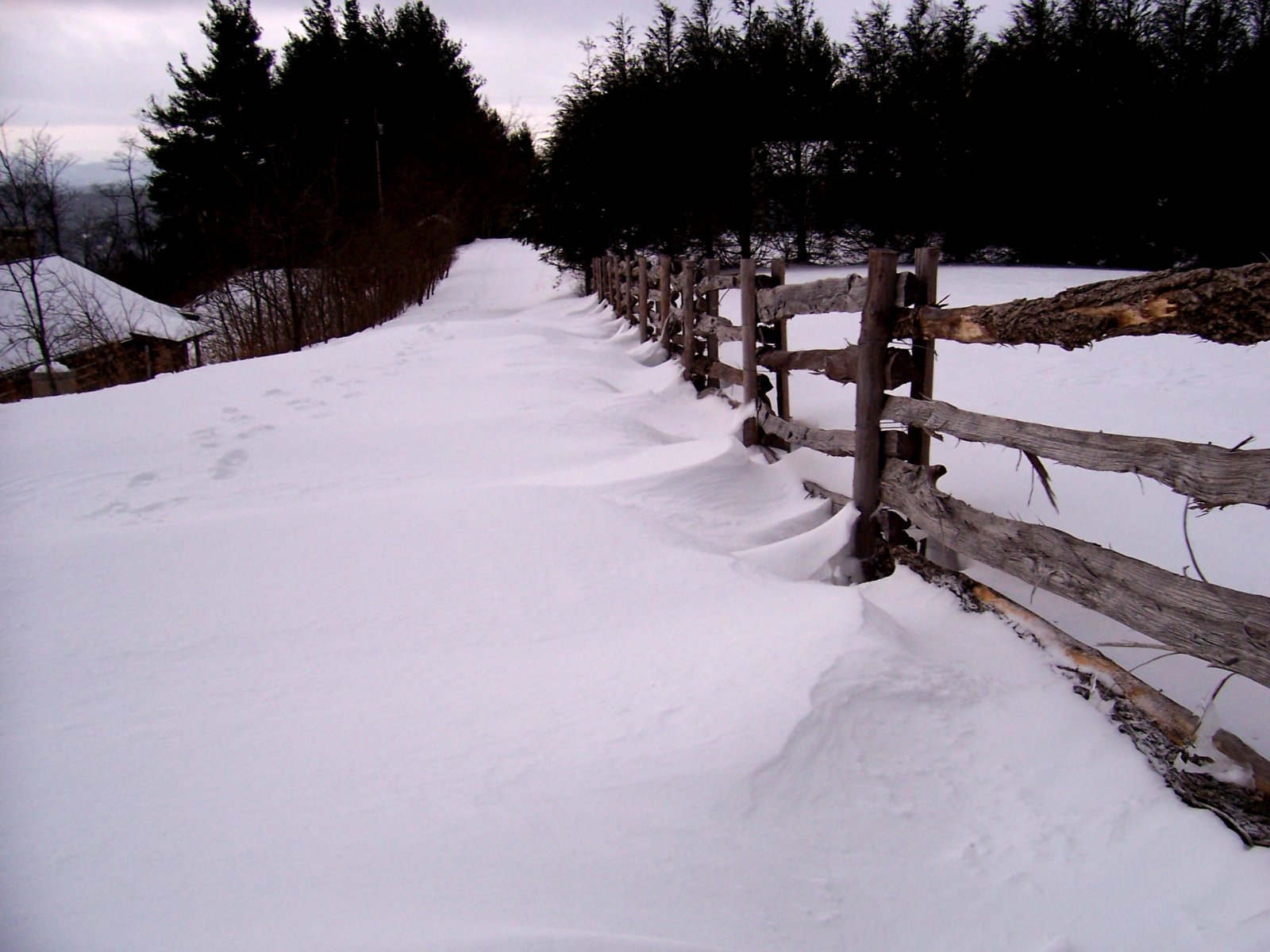
Impassable road in Ashe County, North Carolina after the 2009 blizzard

== Snowfall ==
The storm produced record 24-hour snowfall in Washington, D.C., and Roanoke, Virginia, where nearly 2 feet (61 cm) of snow accumulated. Interior areas of West Virginia saw 30 inches (76 cm) of snow. The storm broke the record for the amount of snow in a single December event at Ronald Reagan Washington National Airport, where 16.4 inches (42 cm) of snow accumulated. The National Weather Service in Brookhaven, New York reported 26.3 inches (67 cm) of snow, the town's largest snowfall since 1949.

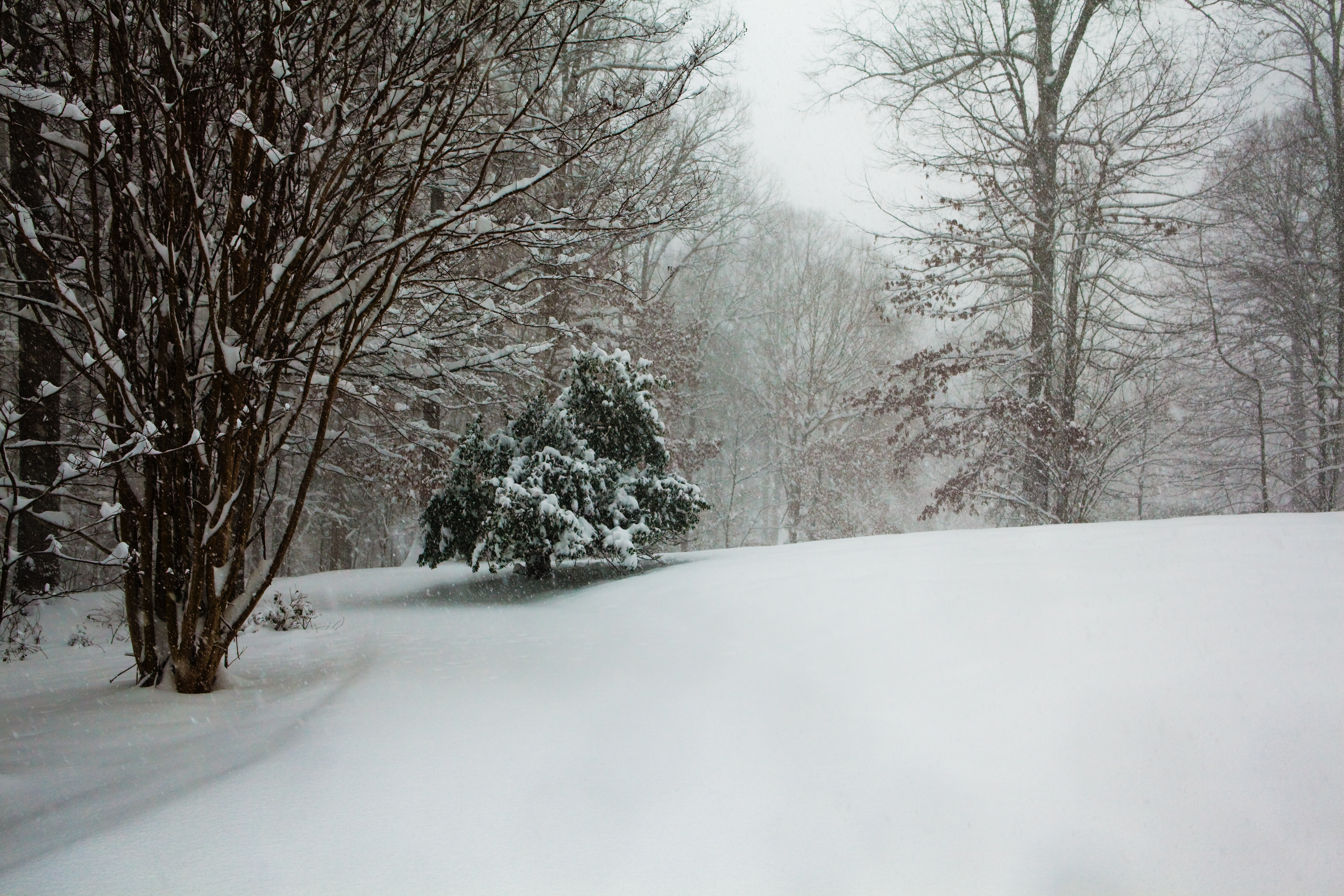
Snowfall during the blizzard in Clifton, Virginia completely covers a road and reduces visibility

In Philadelphia, snowfall reached more than 2 inches (5.1 cm) per hour, resulting in significant disruption of Interstate 95. By Sunday, December 20, 23.2 inches (59 cm) of snowfall had accumulated in Philadelphia, surpassing the city's second-largest record 21 inches (53 cm) snowfall of February 11–12, 1983 – which itself was surpassed less than two months later by the February 5–6, 2010 North American blizzard. The storm also broke a 100-year-old record for the largest single December storm, previously 20.2 inches (51 cm) on December 25–26, 1909. The storm was reported by meteorologists to share attributes of the 1983 storm.

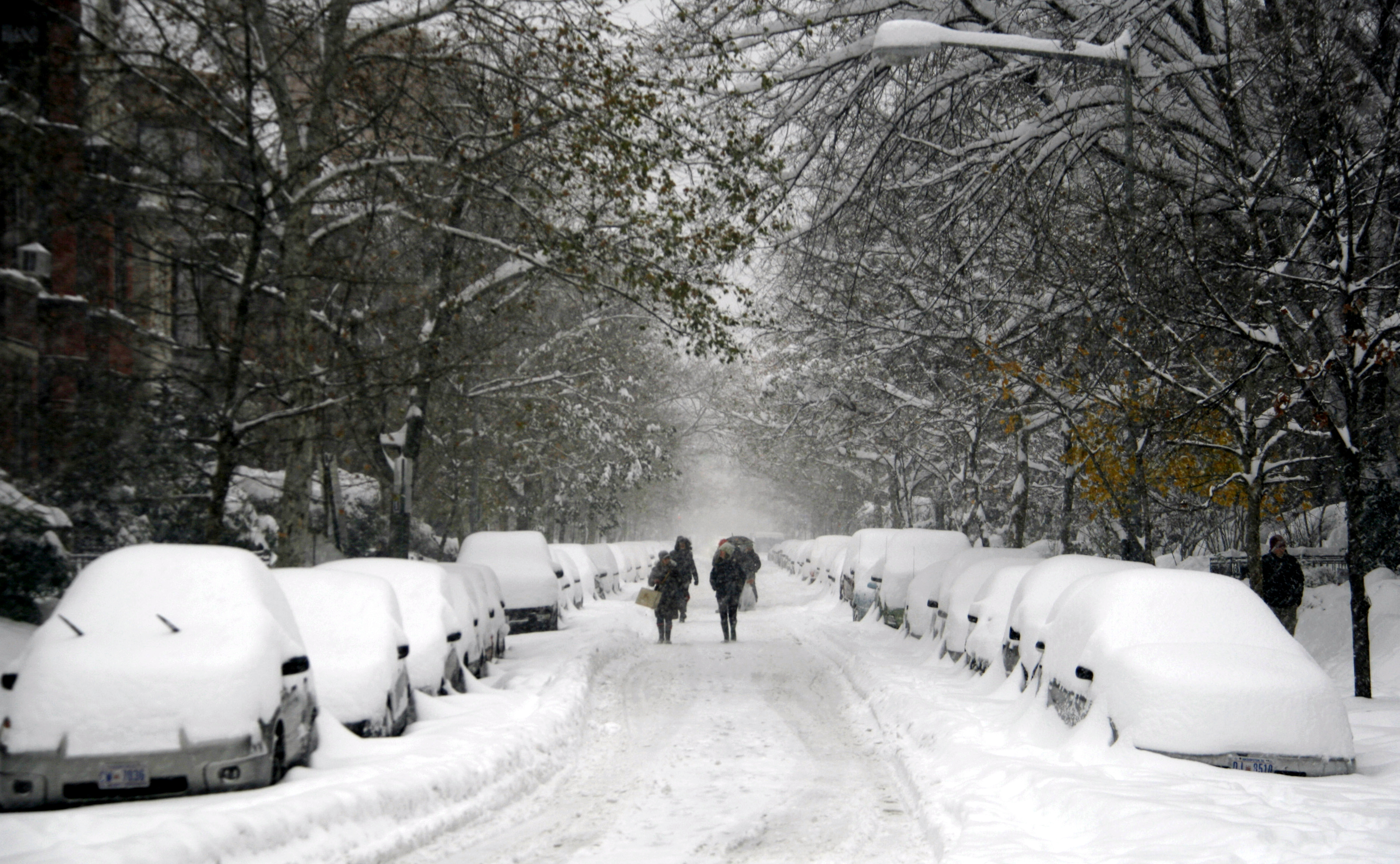
Streetscape of the Dupont Circle neighborhood of Washington, D.C.

In more mountainous areas, snowfall was even heavier. By midnight Saturday morning, snowfall in Boone, North Carolina had reached 14–18 inches (36–46 cm), Asheville, North Carolina accumulated up to 12 inches (30 cm), while Greensboro, North Carolina received 3–7 inches (7.6–17.8 cm). Portions of eastern Kentucky received as much as 16 inches (41 cm). In the Roanoke Valley, over 11 inches (28 cm) had fallen by midnight. By Sunday morning, Norwich, Connecticut received 20 inches (51 cm) of snow, while over 11 inches (28 cm) of snow fell in Boston, Massachusetts.

Winter storm warnings for New York and a blizzard warning for Long Island expired at 11 a.m. Sunday, warnings for the Boston and Providence metro areas and much of southeastern New England expired at noon. A blizzard warning for Cape Cod expired at 1 p.m. The storm reached southwestern portions of Nova Scotia, delivering up to 25 centimetres (9.8 in) of snow in Digby, Yarmouth, Shelburne and Queens counties. Portions of Newfoundland and Labrador received freezing rain as well.

=== Snowfall totals by state ===
List of highest snowfall accumulations by state during the 2009 blizzard (Snowpocalypse)
State	Location	Amount
Connecticut	Clinton, East Haddam, Norwich, Putnam	20.0 in (51 cm)
Washington, D.C.	American University, The Mall	16.0 in (41 cm)
Delaware	Dover	18.0 in (46 cm)
Kentucky	Harlan	7.0 in (18 cm)
Maine	Hampstead	5.4 in (14 cm)
Maryland	Olney	23.3 in (59 cm)
Massachusetts	Bourne	21.5 in (55 cm)
North Carolina	12 miles west of Robbinsville	24.0 in (61 cm)
New Jersey	Folsom	25.7 in (65 cm)
New York	Upton	26.3 in (67 cm)
Ohio	Bridgeport	5.0 in (13 cm)
Pennsylvania	Philadelphia International Airport	23.2 in (59 cm)
Rhode Island	West Greenwich	22.0 in (56 cm)
Virginia	Indian Valley	26.0 in (66 cm)
West Virginia	Marlinton	26.0 in (66 cm)

== Impact ==
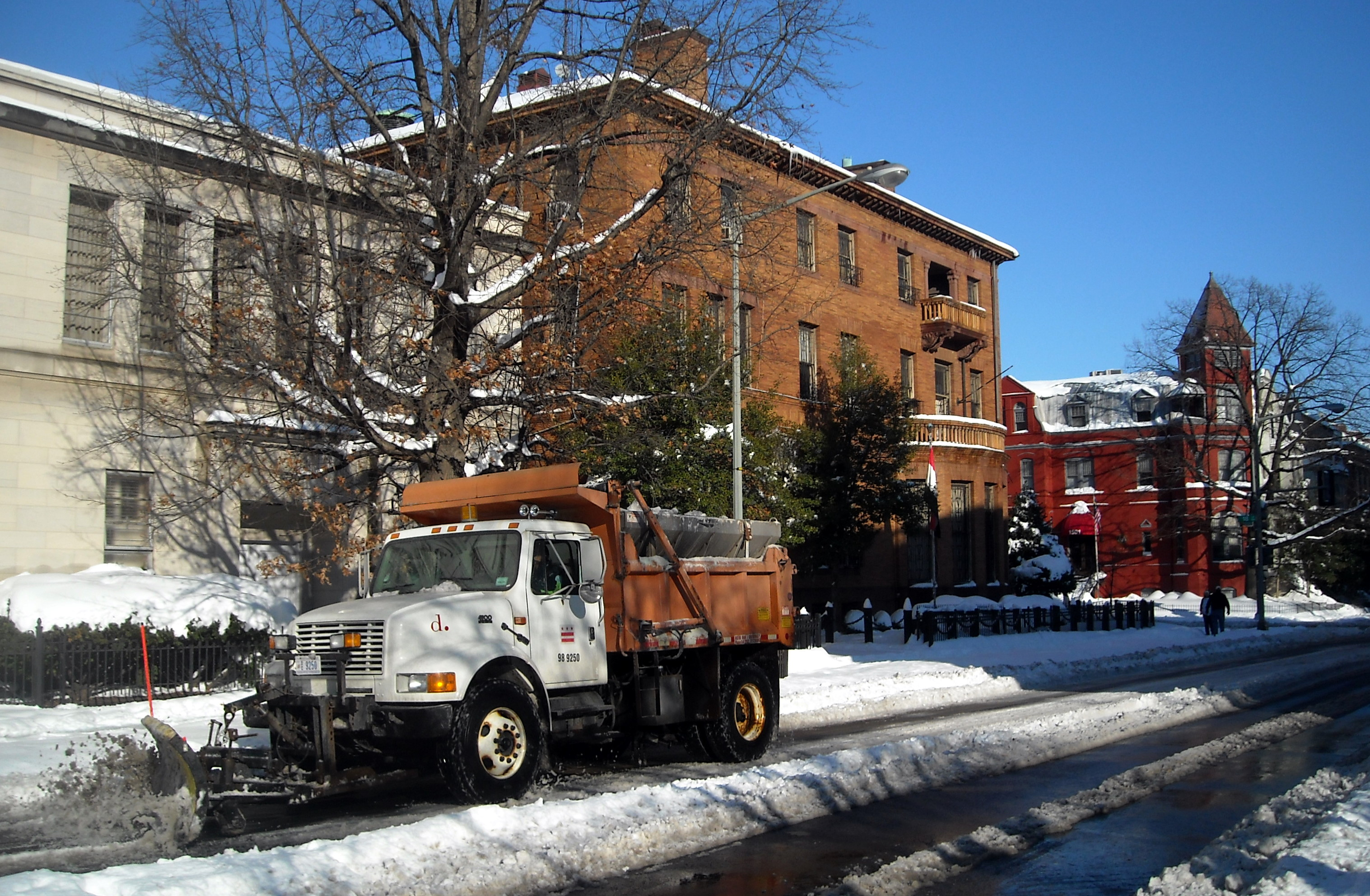
A DDOT snowplow driving past diplomatic missions on P Street, NW, in Dupont Circle, Washington, D.C.

Some regions affected by the storm experienced winds up to 25–30 miles per hour (40–48 km/h) with gusts of 45–50 miles per hour (72–80 km/h). Ronald Reagan Washington National Airport, Washington Dulles International Airport, and Baltimore/Washington International Thurgood Marshall Airport saw whiteout conditions, causing flights to be delayed or canceled. Of 740 scheduled departures at Washington National and 530 at Dulles, only 14 and 12, respectively, were able to take off. President Barack Obama, arriving at Andrews Air Force Base after the UN Climate Conference, was forced to return to the White House by motorcade instead of helicopter. More than 800 flights were canceled at New York City's three major airports. Delays averaged over six hours at Philadelphia International Airport.

Many Amtrak trains were also canceled or delayed and service on Washington, D.C.'s Metrorail was suspended to all outdoor stations at 1 pm on December 19 and remained suspended until late in the day December 20; underground service remained operational. One Amtrak train, carrying 255 passengers, halted for six hours while a frozen track switch was fixed.

On roads, snow plows were unable to keep up with fast snow accumulations. Road accidents and stuck vehicles further hindered snow removal. On some major highways, traffic slowed to five miles per hour. In West Virginia, on I-77 between Ghent and Beckley, thousands of motorists were stranded for up to 18 hours due to impassable roads. The interstate was closed for 15 hours. Governor Joe Manchin has launched a full investigation into why the roads were in such poor condition. Greyhound Lines canceled 294 routes through Maryland, Virginia, Washington, D.C., and West Virginia on December 19 and suspended service in and out of New York late Saturday.

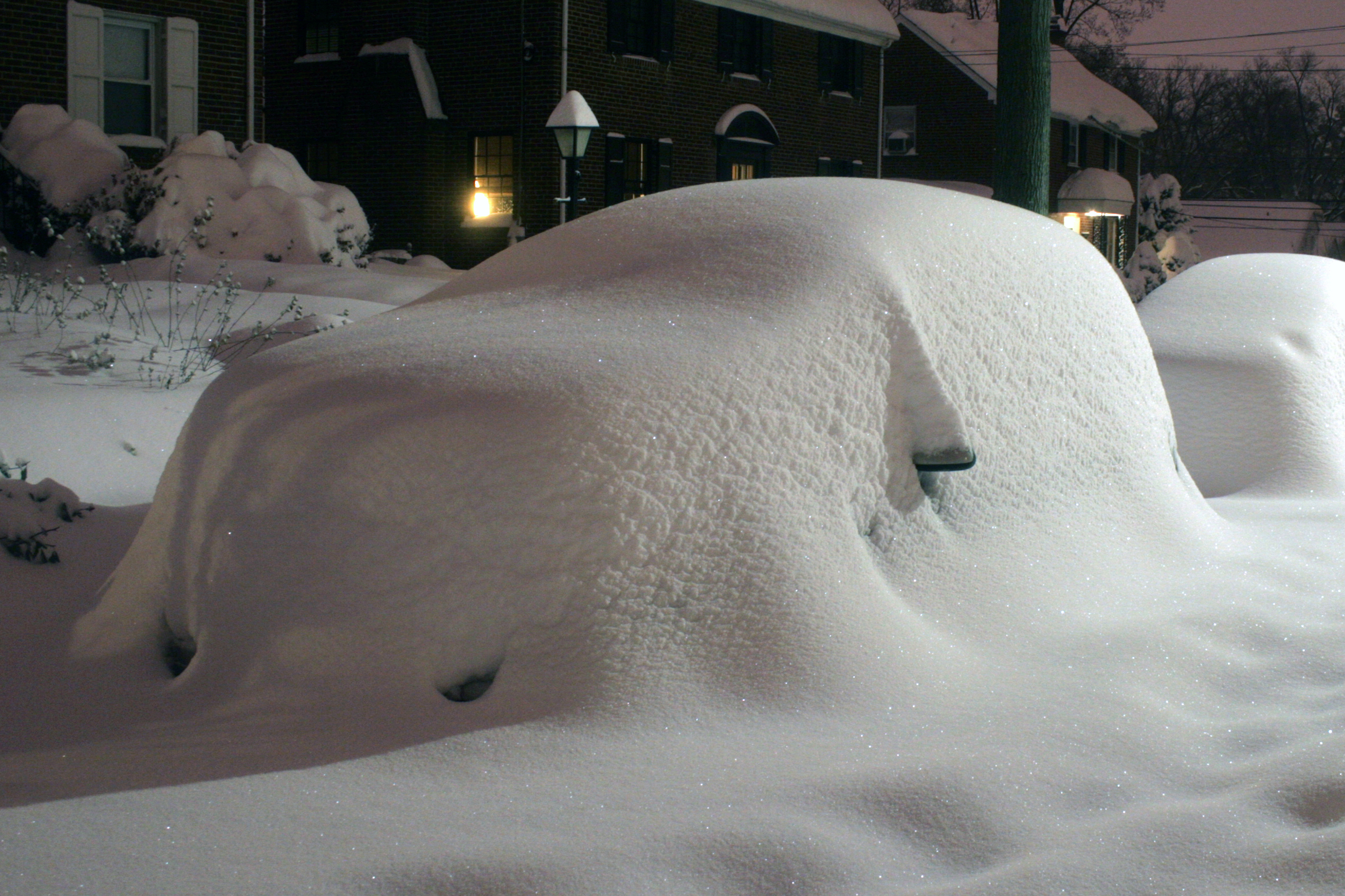
Cars buried by nearly 24 inches (61 cm) of snow in Woodley Park, Washington, D.C., on December 19

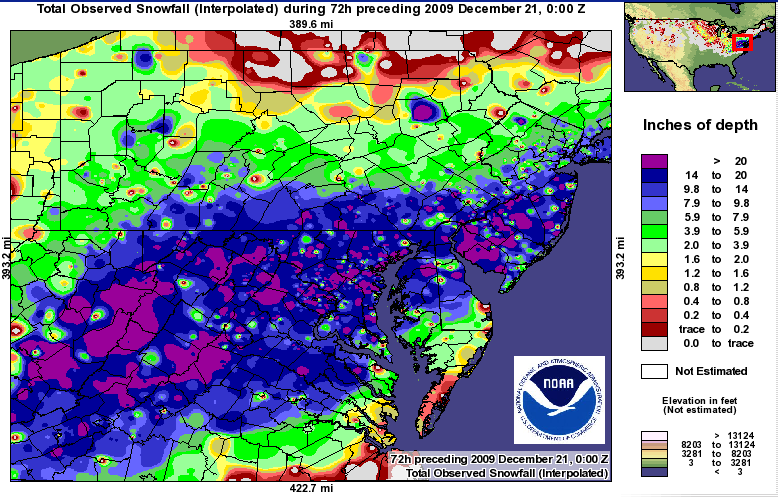
National Weather Service image showing snowfall accumulation for the Mid-Atlantic states

Thousands of power outages were reported in Virginia, Kentucky, and North Carolina, reportedly caused by snow weighing down on power lines. By midnight Saturday morning, when the storm had just begun to strike the area, reported power outages had already exceeded 40,000. In Kentucky, 107,000 power outages were reported. A snow emergency was declared in Washington, D.C., where Mayor Adrian Fenty asked residents to avoid venturing onto the roads. States of emergency were declared in Kentucky, Maryland, Virginia, West Virginia and New Castle and Kent counties in Delaware.

The storm was held responsible for seven deaths in North Carolina, Ohio, Pennsylvania, Virginia, and West Virginia, including one death resulting from a head-on collision between a snowmobile driver and a horse-drawn carriage.

The nor'easter, which arrived on the last weekend before Christmas, hurt sales at retail stores in affected regions, but boosted online sales. Super Saturday, the last Saturday before Christmas, typically nets $15 billion in retail sales. It is estimated that 30% of this revenue comes from the northeastern United States. Stores that managed to open saw reduced traffic. The storm resulted in an estimated loss of $2 billion in retail sales.

Due to widespread accumulation of heavy snow, the storm was ranked as a high-end Category 2 ("significant") winter storm, on the Northeast Snowfall Impact Scale. The ranking is based on the amount of snowfall, the area, and the population affected.

=== Tornado outbreak ===
The same system produced severe weather in Florida. Four EF0 tornadoes touched down in the state, causing mostly minor damage.

== See also ==
- List of Regional Snowfall Index Category 4 winter storms
- List of NESIS storms
- 2009 North American Christmas blizzard
- February 5–6, 2010 North American blizzard
- February 9–10, 2010 North American blizzard
- February 25–27, 2010 North American blizzard
- December 2010 North American blizzard
- January 2016 United States blizzard
- Winter of 2009–2010 in Europe
- Winter storms of 2009–2010
- Winter storms of 2009–2010 in East Asia
