= List of regional snowfall index category 5 winter storms =

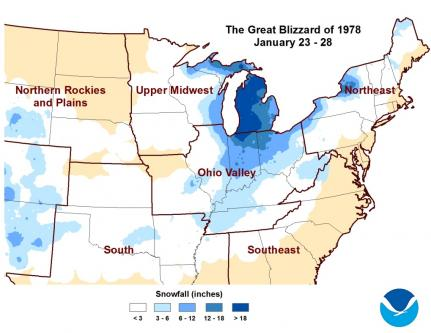
Snowfall map of the Great Blizzard of 1978, the highest-ranking storm on the regional snowfall index, outlining the six regions assessed with the scale

The regional snowfall index (RSI) is a system used by NOAA to assess the societal impact of winter storms in the United States. The system is a replacement for the Northeast snowfall impact scale (NESIS) system. Since its initiation, the NCDC has retroactively assigned RSI values to over 500 historical storms since 1900.

Storms are ranked from category 0 ("nuisance") to 5 ("extreme") on the scale. The impact of the storms is assessed in six different regions of the United States: Northeast, Northern Rockies & Plains, Ohio Valley, South, Southeast, and Upper Midwest. A category 5 extreme ranking is indicated by a numerical score of 18 or higher on the scale.

Out of the over 500 historical storms assessed since 1900, only 27 storms have been given a category 5 ranking. The highest ranking storm on the list is the Great Blizzard of 1978, which scored a value of 39.07. The most recent storm to receive a category 5 ranking is the March 2026 North American blizzard, which scored a value of 26.97. The following list orders the storms chronologically.

== List of category 5 events ==
Year	Date	Max. RSI	Region	Ref(s)
1920	April 14–18	20.84	Northern Rockies and Plains	
1921	February 17–21	31.89	South	
1922	January 25–29	18.53	Southeast	
1927	February 26 – March 2	24.42	Southeast	
1927	April 4–10	34.20	Northern Rockies and Plains	
1929	December 18–23	21.13	South	
1940	January 20–23	18.14	Southeast	
1943	January 18–25	21.14	Northern Rockies and Plains	
1950	November 24–27	34.69	Ohio Valley	
1966	February 27 – March 5	20.38	Northern Rockies and Plains	
1967	January 24–28	18.13	Ohio Valley	
1969	February 21–27	34.03	Northeast	
1971	February 18–23	19.36	South	
1978	January 22–27	39.07	Upper Midwest, Ohio Valley	
1978	February 5–7	18.42	Northeast	
1984	April 24–27	25.95	Northern Rockies and Plains	
1985	February 6–14	27.06	Upper Midwest	
1985	November 27 – December 1	22.19	Upper Midwest	
1988	January 4–8	22.64	South	
1991	October 30 – November 3	30.18	Upper Midwest	
1993	March 12–14	24.63	Northeast, Ohio Valley, Southeast	
1993	November 20–28	22.00	Northern Rockies and Plains	
1996	January 5–8	26.37	Northeast, Southeast	
2009	December 21–28	19.62	Northern Rockies and Plains	
2011	January 31 – February 2	21.99	Ohio Valley	
2016	January 19–24	20.14	Northeast	
2026	March 13–17	26.97	Upper Midwest	

== Listed by month ==
Month	Number of recorded storms
October	1
November	3
December	2
January	8
February	6
March	3
April	3
Source	National Climatic Data Center

== See also ==
- List of regional snowfall index category 4 winter storms
- List of Northeast snowfall impact scale winter storms
- List of blizzards
