= List of regional snowfall index category 4 winter storms =

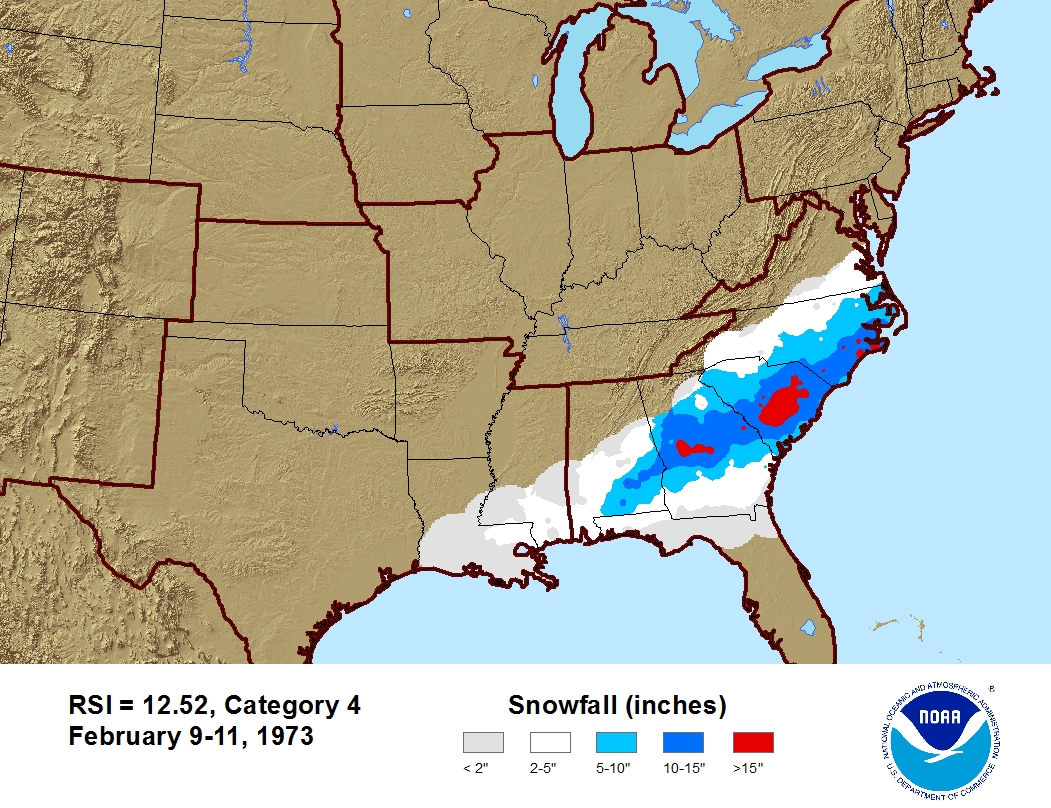
Snowfall map of the February 1973 United States blizzard, a category 4 winter storm, outlining the thresholds for Regional Snowfall Index in the Southeast and showing the different regions assessed using the scale

The regional snowfall index (RSI) is a system used by NOAA to assess the societal impacts of winter storms in the United States. The scale is a replacement for the Northeast snowfall impact scale (NESIS) system, which was used for winter storms just in the Northeastern United States; Regional Snowfall Index assesses winter storm impacts in the six easternmost regions of the United States instead of just the Northeast. Since its initiation, the NCDC has assigned RSI values to nearly 600 winter storms since 1900.

Storms are ranked from category 0 "nuisance" to category 5 "extreme" on the scale. A category 4 winter storm on the RSI scale is classified as "crippling". The impact of the storms is assessed in six different regions of the United States: the Northeast, Northern Rockies and Plains, Ohio Valley, South, Southeast, and Upper Midwest. A category 4 "crippling" ranking is indicated by a numerical score between 10 and 18 on the scale.

Out of the nearly 600 historical winter storms assessed since 1900, only 74 storms have been given a category 4 or above ranking, 48 of which were category 4 storms. The highest ranking category 4 winter storm is the March 2–8, 1915 United States blizzard, which had an RSI of 17.67. The most recent storm to receive a category 4 ranking is the December 2022 North American winter storm, which scored an RSI value of 11.49. The following list orders the category 4 storms chronologically.

== List of category 4 events ==
This list includes all winter storms which had a maximum RSI value in the category 4 range. Storms that ranked as a category 4 in some regions but ranked as a category 5 in one or more other regions are not included in this list.

Year	Date	Max. RSI	Region
1900	February 26 – March 3	15.65	Northeast, South
1902	February 13–19	10.16	Southeast
1902	March 3–6	12.19	Northeast, South
1910	February 16–18	11.34	Ohio Valley
1913	November 7–11	16.09	Ohio Valley
1915	March 2–8	17.67	Northern Rockies and Plains, South
1918	December 21–26	10.61	South
1929	December 16–21	10.62	Upper Midwest
1930	December 13–18	13.97	Southeast
1933	April 18–22	12.69	Northern Rockies and Plains
1936	February 6–8	11.26	Southeast
1947	January 27–31	10.18	Upper Midwest
1947	February 27 – March 4	10.63	Northeast
1949	January 1–6	15.79	Northern Rockies and Plains
1951	March 9–17	12.97	Upper Midwest
1955	April 3–6	16.93	Northern Rockies and Plains
1956	January 31 – February 6	13.78	South
1962	February 28 – March 7	11.79	Southeast
1962	March 5–9	12.66	Southeast
1966	January 27–31	12.28	Northeast
1969	December 25–29	10.14	Northeast
1971	February 26 – March 6	10.18	Northeast
1973	February 9–11	12.52	Southeast
1978	December 28, 1978 – January 3, 1979	10.08	Upper Midwest
1979	January 12–15	14.42	Ohio Valley
1979	February 17–20	15.01	Southeast
1979	November 17–22	10.81	Northern Rockies and Plains
1980	February 5–10	10.55	South
1980	February 28 – March 3	15.14	Southeast
1983	February 10–13	14.78	Southeast
1985	March 1–5	15.18	Upper Midwest, Northern Rockies and Plains
1987	January 21–24	13.16	Southeast
1987	April 2–6	11.21	Ohio Valley
1999	January 2–4	15.30	Upper Midwest, Ohio Valley
2003	February 14–19	14.67	Northeast
2004	December 21–24	11.31	Ohio Valley
2005	January 20–23	10.34	Northeast
2006	March 19–22	14.22	Northern Rockies and Plains
2009	March 27–30	14.95	South
2009	December 16–20	15.71	Southeast
2010	February 5–6	10.15	Southeast
2010	February 8–13	12.75	South
2010	February 10–13	10.07	South
2010	February 25–27	15.85	Northeast
2011	February 9–11	11.80	South
2014	February 11–24	10.66	Southeast
2017	March 11–15	10.66	Northeast
2018	April 13–15	15.7	Upper Midwest
2022	December 13–20	15.826	Northern Rockies and Plains
2022	December 21–26	11.49	Upper Midwest

== Listed by month ==
Month	Number of recorded storms
November	2
December	7
January	7
February	17
March	10
April	4
Source	National Climatic Data Center

== See also ==
- List of regional snowfall index category 5 winter storms
- List of Northeast snowfall impact scale winter storms
- List of blizzards
