= January 1979 North American blizzard =

Blizzard event in 1979

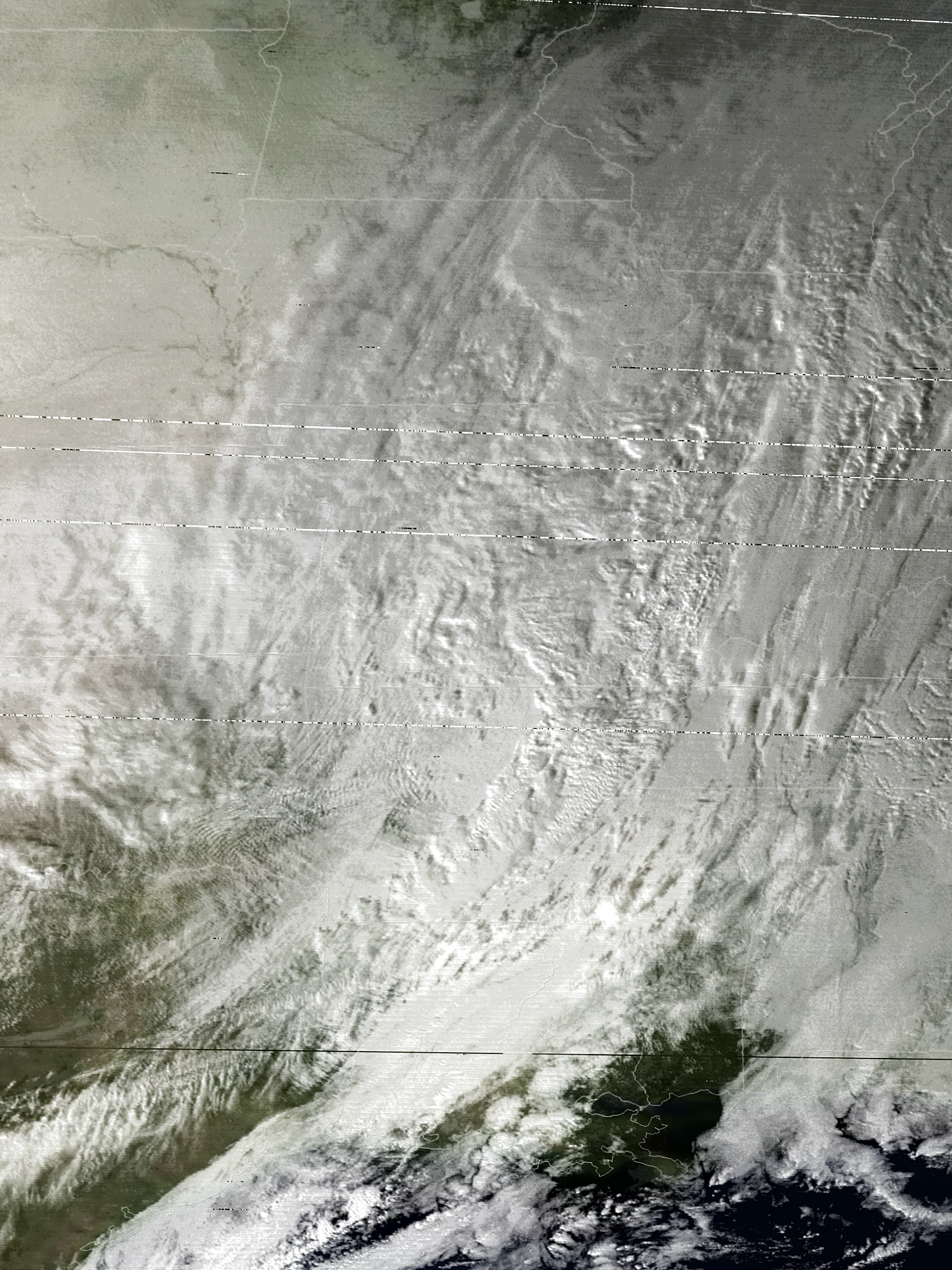
- The storm complex responsible for the blizzard late on January 13

Meteorological history
- Formed: January 12, 1979
- Dissipated: January 15, 1979

Category 4 "Crippling" blizzard
- Regional snowfall index: 14.42 (NOAA)
- Max. snowfall: 20.3 inches (52 cm)

Overall effects
- Fatalities: > 53
- Damage: > $1 billion USD
- Areas affected: Midwestern United States (Illinois, Indiana, Wisconsin, Kansas, Iowa, Michigan)

The January 1979 North American blizzard was a major blizzard in the Midwestern United States that lasted from January 12 through January 15 of that year. The storm affected nearly 162 million people and distributed snowfall over 1,979,439 square miles (5,126,720 km^{2}). This made it among the most severe in recorded meteorological history to have impacted the Ohio Valley region of the United States, notably across the Chicago metropolitan area.

Across the Ohio Valley, it was the only RSI Category 4 ("crippling") storm recorded during the 1970s. The storm also impacted portions of the upper Midwest as an RSI Category 3 ("major") storm. In Chicago, it was the heaviest storm of the decade in terms of snowfall, and until it was surpassed by the 1999 blizzard, the second largest of the century behind the 1967 blizzard. As of 2026, it remains the fourth-heaviest snowstorm in Chicago history, after the 2011 Groundhog Day blizzard.

== Origins and development ==
At the beginning of the second week of January 1979, the top portion of a ridge near the West Coast produced a closed high that moved northward over the Beaufort Sea, facilitating increased westerly flows from the Pacific Ocean. The resulting system generated heavy precipitation as it moved eastward across the United States. A shortwave trough which produced an ice storm during January 9–10 around Portland, Oregon due to cold air trapped in the Columbia River basin then combined with another, more intense shortwave within a low pressure system moving northeast, which amplified over the southern Great Plains. This generated an intense storm across the Midwest. Originally forecast to pass over Toledo and northwest Ohio, the storm instead continued moving northeast over Indiana and Michigan, including the city of Flint, before entering Canada and dissipating.

== Impact ==
Northern Illinois, northern Indiana, southeastern Wisconsin, and western Michigan received the full brunt of the storm. Heavy snow and ice accumulations caused numerous roof collapses and extensive property damage across northeastern Illinois, Iowa, western Michigan, and southeastern Wisconsin.

=== Illinois and Iowa ===
The blizzard had its greatest impact in the Chicago metropolitan area from January 12–14, 1979. The blizzard lasted for a total of 38 hours. At its peak, wind gusts reached speeds of 39 miles (63 km) per hour.

Only 2 inches (5.1 cm) to 4 inches (10 cm) of snow had been expected but from 8 p.m. on January 12 until 2 a.m. on January 14, 20.3 inches (52 cm) of snow was recorded to have fallen at Midway Airport, which closed as a result. O'Hare Airport was closed and all flights were grounded for 96 hours, from January 13 to 15. Frozen switches caused the suspension of Chicago Transit Authority (CTA) Chicago "L" elevated train services north of Wilson Avenue, while CTA buses operated on limited and delayed schedules.

By the end of Sunday, January 14, the depth of snow on the ground in Chicago peaked at 29 inches (74 cm). Area communities reported unofficial snowfall totals from 12 inches (30 cm) (Rockford) to 20 inches (51 cm) (in Arlington Heights, Elmhurst, Franklin Park, Glen Ellyn, Morton Grove, Oak Park, Palatine, Schaumburg, Skokie, and Wilmette). Seven-foot drifts closed highways in Lake and Kane counties. On Monday, January 15, Governor Jim Thompson declared a state of emergency in 22 counties. The following day, at the request of the state government, President Carter declared Cook and 21 other northern Illinois counties a disaster area to release federal funds for snow clearance assistance. In the Quad Cities region of southeastern Iowa and northwestern Illinois, an estimated 18.4 inches (47 cm) fell between January 12–14.

At least 22 people died in Illinois as a result of the blizzard. Several died in the Chicago area, apparently from heart attacks while shoveling snow, while one died after slipping and falling over a stairwell railing. An intellectually disabled young male resident at the Waukegan Developmental Center died of hypothermia after wandering outside in his underwear. Approximately 15 other people around Chicago were seriously injured due to conditions created by the storm. In addition, a snowplow driver went berserk, hitting 34 cars and ramming a man, killing him. Economic losses in the Chicago area alone were estimated at nearly $1 billion.

The storm also disrupted the investigation into serial killer John Wayne Gacy, while investigators were examining his crawl space underneath his Des Plaines home searching for victims he had murdered and buried there between 1972 and 1978. This Increased the time before more victims could be recovered, specifically bodies 28 and 29, ones not featured during Gacy's drawn maps which only featured 27 victims, which before suspension had all been recovered. This lengthened the time when Gacy's confession could be used to prove he was lying and therefore revealing the possibility of more victims.

=== Indiana ===
Over 16 inches (41 cm) of snow fell in Indiana, mostly in the Calumet Region, which recorded 20.3 inches (52 cm). In Hammond, the building housing the Hammond News Agency, previously damaged by a car, partially collapsed under the weight of snow. Drifting snow shorted out electrical components on the South Shore Line's 50-year-old railcars, resulting in the suspension of service. On January 16, Governor Otis Bowen declared four northern Indiana counties to be a disaster area due to the blizzard's impact.

=== Michigan ===
Grand Rapids received 13.5 inches (34 cm) of snow, measured at Kent County International Airport. Both North Central Airlines and United Airlines cancelled all flights, partly due to the blizzard's closure of O'Hare International. Roofs collapsed under the weight of thick snow in Grand Rapids, Holland, and the village of Edmore in Home Township, including the second story of the Home Township Library in Edmore.

Most secondary roads in Montcalm County were closed, along with state highways 91 and 57. The western Lower Peninsula was the most affected. 18 inches (46 cm) to 22 inches (56 cm) of snow fell in Muskegon. South Haven received at least 22 inches (56 cm).

=== Wisconsin ===
The southeastern counties of Kenosha, Milwaukee and Racine were the hardest hit. At the Racine Journal Times offices, wind gusts of 50 miles per hour (80 km/h) were recorded on January 13, and the roof of a lumber company office collapsed under heavy snow in Sturtevant. In Milwaukee, 14.6 inches (37 cm) fell, and for the first time since 1947, the Milwaukee school district was closed for two consecutive days. Up to 19 inches (48 cm) of snow fell across Kenosha county during January 13–14. Roofs collapsed in the rural communities of Silver Lake, Bristol, and Salem. On January 16, Governor Lee Dreyfus declared a state of emergency for both the city of Milwaukee and Kenosha county. President Carter subsequently declared a federal state of emergency for both affected areas on January 19.

In the city of Kenosha, numerous mechanical breakdowns due to overworked snowplows hampered clearance efforts. Local estimates rated the storm as the worst since at least the 1940s. At the local Coast Guard station, the temperature at 2 a.m. on January 15 was recorded at −18 °F (−28 °C), with a wind chill factor of −74 °F (−59 °C). At least four people died from blizzard-related causes in the Kenosha area; of those, two male city residents died from heart attacks while shoveling snow and attempting to free a car trapped in snow, respectively. A Wheatland man also died from a heart attack while shoveling snow, while a 41-year-old city resident slipped and fell from a ladder while clearing snow from his roof, striking his head and ultimately dying from his injuries in October 1981.

== Aftermath ==
53rd Street in Hyde Park, Chicago after the blizzard

Further snowstorms continuing into February added to record snowfall totals across the affected regions; by early March, the greater Chicago area had received a record 89.7 inches (228 cm) of snow for the winter of 1978–79.

In Chicago, snow remained on the ground until March 6, a full fifty-one days later. Deployment of plows was significantly delayed, and when they finally appeared they struggled to keep up with the snowfall. Much of the snow remained unmoved throughout the next two months, causing ongoing public transit delays and significant problems with trash collection. The cold weather and snowfall throughout the rest of January and February resulted in frozen tracks throughout the Chicago 'L' system. The city's inadequate response to the blizzard was blamed primarily on mayor Michael Bilandic, who had assumed the post after the 1976 death of Richard J. Daley. Newspaper articles at the time blasted Bilandic. Jane Byrne, Bilandic's main opposition in the Democratic primary, capitalized on this and defeated Bilandic in the February 27 primary, eventually becoming the first female mayor of Chicago.

== See also ==
- List of Regional Snowfall Index Category 4 winter storms
