= List of blizzards =

This is a list of blizzards, arranged alphabetically by continent. A blizzard is defined as a severe snowstorm characterized by strong sustained winds of at least 56 kilometres per hour (35 mph) and lasting for three hours or more. The list states blizzards in various countries since 1972.

== Africa ==
Location	Country	Date	Category	Notes
Johannesburg	South Africa	June 27, 2007		

== Asia ==
Location	Country	Date	Category	Notes
	Iran	February, 1972		1972 Iran blizzard
	Afghanistan	February, 2008		2008 Afghanistan blizzard
Hubei, Hunan, Zhejiang, Guizhou, Guangdong, Jiangxi, Guangxi, Fujian, Henan, Shandong, Jiangsu, Anhui, Shanghai, Chongqing, Shanxi, Sichuan	China	25 January 2008		2008 Chinese winter storms

== Australia ==
Location	Country	Date	Category	Notes
Canberra	Australia	July 12, 2015		

== Europe ==
Location	Country	Date	Category	Notes
England	United Kingdom	1614-15		Among most significant winters in UK history; the snowfalls of 16-22 January 1615 were particularly notable
Most of Europe	Most of Europe	16 December 2009		Winter of 2009–10 in Europe
England, Wales, Netherlands, Belgium, Germany	United Kingdom, Central Europe, Eastern Europe	18 January 2018		Cyclone David/Friederike

== North America ==
Location	Country	Date	Category	Notes
Midwestern United States	US	January 9–12 1975	3	Great Storm of 1975
Northeastern United States, Southeastern Canada	Canada, US	February 2, 1976	2	Groundhog Day gale of 1976
Western New York, Southern Ontario	Canada, US	January 28–February 1, 1977	-	Blizzard of 1977
Ohio Valley and Great Lakes region and Southern Ontario	Canada, US	January 25–27, 1978	5	Great Blizzard of 1978
New England, New Jersey, Pennsylvania, New York metropolitan area	US	February 5–7, 1978	5	Northeastern United States blizzard of 1978
Northern Illinois, northwest Indiana	US	January 13–14, 1979	4	1979 Chicago blizzard
Upper Midwest of the United States	US	October 31–November 3, 1991	5	1991 Halloween blizzard
Eastern United States, Eastern Canada	Canada, US	March 12–15, 1993	5	1993 Storm of the Century
Northeastern United States	US	January 6–8, 1996	5	North American blizzard of 1996
Northeastern United States	US	March 31–April 1, 1997	2	1997 April Fool's Day blizzard
Midwestern United States, Central and Eastern Canada	Canada, US	January 2–4, 1999	4	North American blizzard of 1999
North Carolina, Virginia	US	January 25, 2000	3	January 2000 North American blizzard
East Coast of the United States and Canada	Canada, US	February 14–19, 2003	4	North American blizzard of 2003
Northeastern United States, Atlantic Canada	Canada, US	February 17–20, 2004	-	White Juan
Ohio Valley, Ontario	Canada, US	December 21–24, 2004	4	December 21–24, 2004 North American winter storm
Upper Midwest, Great Lakes region, Northeastern United States, British Isles, Scandinavian Peninsula	Canada, US, UK	January 20–23, 2005	4	North American blizzard of 2005
Virginia, Maryland, District of Columbia, Pennsylvania, New York, New Jersey, Delaware, New England, Atlantic Canada	Canada, US	February 11, 2006	2	North American blizzard of 2006
Central Canada, Midwestern United States, Northern Plains	Canada, US	November 27–December 1, 2006	-	Early Winter 2006 North American storm complex
Midwestern United States from Nebraska to Ohio, Northeastern United States, Canadian provinces Ontario and New Brunswick	Canada, US	February 12–17, 2007	3	North American blizzard of 2007
Southern and eastern North America	Canada, US	March 6–10, 2008	-	North American blizzard of 2008
Virginia to Maine, Canadian Atlantic provinces (portions of Nova Scotia, Newfoundland, Labrador)	Canada, US	December 16–20, 2009	4	December 2009 North American blizzard
Midwestern United States, Great Plains, Southeastern United States, Eastern Seaboard, parts of Ontario	Canada, US	December 22–24, 2009	5	2009 North American Christmas blizzard
Illinois to North Carolina to New York and New Mexico, Mexico, Eastern Canada	Canada, US	February 5–6, 2010	3	February 5–6, 2010 North American blizzard
Illinois to Virginia to Vermont, New England, and Eastern Canada	Canada, US	February 9–10, 2010	2	February 9–10, 2010 North American blizzard
Mid-Atlantic region, New England, West Virginia, Eastern Canada	Canada, US	February 25–27, 2010	4	February 25–27, 2010 North American blizzard
Mid-Atlantic region, New England, Eastern Canada	Canada, US	March 2010	-	March 2010 nor'easter
Alaska, Western Canada, Contiguous United States, Eastern Canada, Northern Europe, Russia	Canada, Russia, UK, US	December 27, 2010	2	December 2010 North American blizzard
Central United States, Southern Plains, New England, Northeastern Mexico, Great Lakes, Eastern Canada	Canada, Mexico, US	January 31 – February 2, 2011	5	January 31 – February 2, 2011 North American blizzard
Pacific Northwest, Great Plains, South Central United States, Eastern United States (especially the Mid-Atlantic states), Atlantic Canada, British Isles, Finland	Canada	January 19 - 29, 2016	5	January 2016 North American blizzard
Pacific Northwest, Western United States, Rocky Mountains, Midwestern United States, New England	US	March 4 - 17, 2021	3	March 2021 North American blizzard
Midwestern United States, Great Lakes, New England	Canada, US	December 21 - 26, 2022	4	December 2022 North American winter storm
Western United States	US	February 21 - 28, 2023	2	February 2023 North American storm complex
High Plains, United States	US	January 5 - 6, 2025	2	January 5–6, 2025 United States blizzard
Gulf Coast, United States	US	January 20 - 22, 2025	1	2025 Gulf Coast blizzard
Northeastern United States, New England	US	February 22 - 24, 2026,	3	February 2026 North American blizzard
Central United States, Southern Canada	Canada, US	March 13 - 17, 2026	5	March 2026 North American blizzard

== South America ==
Location	Country	Date	Category	Notes
Southern regions of Chile	Chile	6-16 August, 1995		White Earthquake
Southern-Central regions of Argentina	Argentina	6 July, 2007		July 2007 Argentine winter storm
Buenos Aires province of Argentina	Argentina	22 July, 2009		
Biobio and Araucanía regions of Chile	Chile	July 2011		July 2011 Chilean winter storm

== See also ==
- List of ice storms
- List of costly or deadly hailstorms
- List of dust storms with visibility of 1/4 mile or less, or meters or less
- List of weather records
- Lowest temperature recorded on Earth
