= 2011 Groundhog Day blizzard =

2011 blizzard affecting the U.S. and Canada

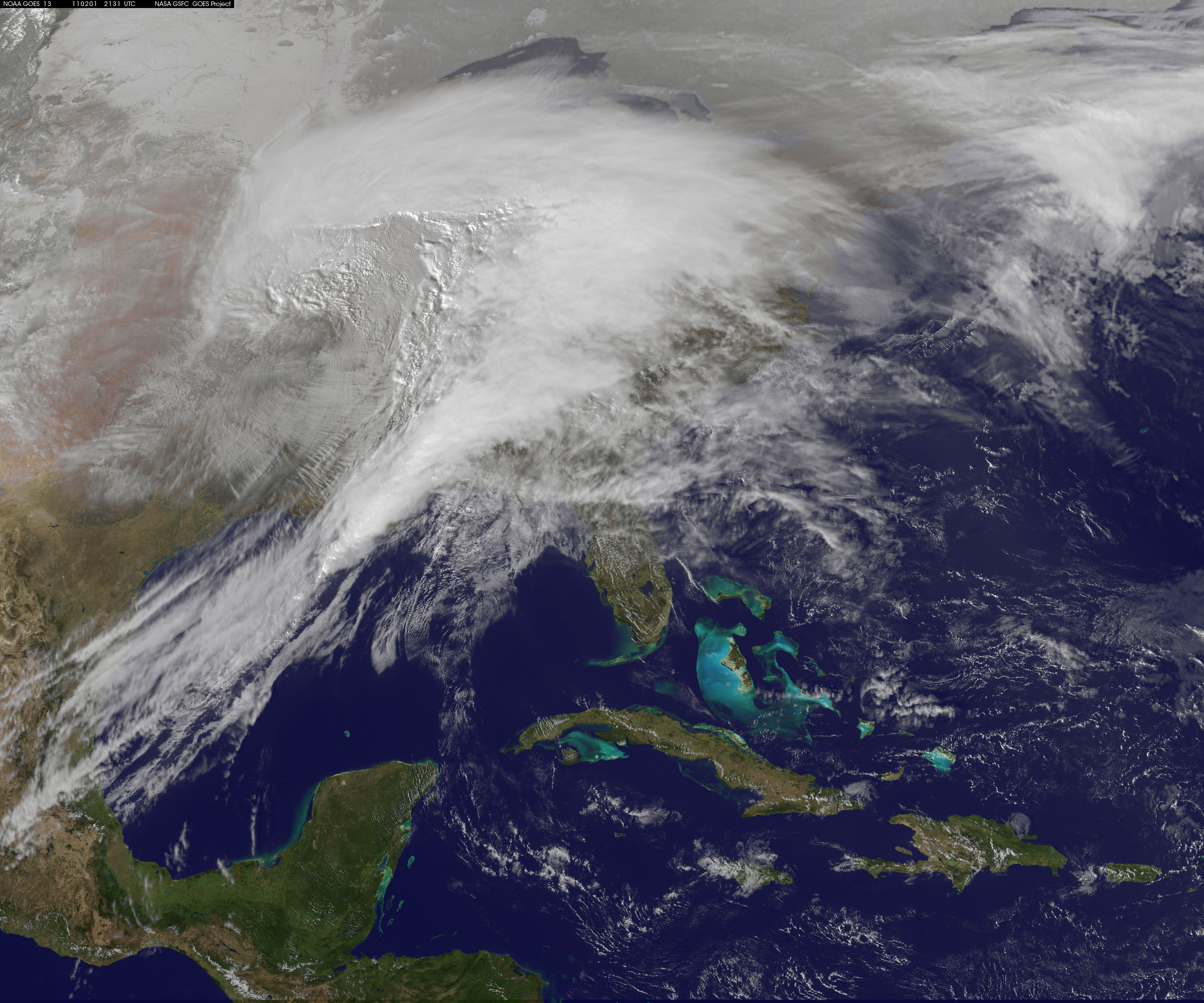
- The extratropical cyclone responsible for the blizzard striking the Midwestern United States on the afternoon of February 1

Meteorological history
- Formed: January 31, 2011
- Dissipated: February 3, 2011

Category 5 "Extreme" blizzard
- Regional snowfall index: 21.99 (NOAA)
- Lowest pressure: 996 mbar (hPa); 29.41 inHg
- Max. snowfall: Snow – 27.0 in (69 cm) in Antioch, Illinois; Ice – 1.0 in (2.5 cm) in Cashtown, Pennsylvania

Tornado outbreak
- Tornadoes: 3
- Max. rating: EF1 tornado
- Duration: February 1, 2011

Overall effects
- Fatalities: 36 total
- Damage: $1.8 billion (2011 USD)
- Areas affected: Central United States, Southeastern US, New England, Northeastern Mexico, Great Lakes, Eastern Canada
- Part of the 2010–11 North American winter

The 2011 Groundhog Day blizzard was a deadly, historic and crippling blizzard that affected large swaths of the United States and Canada from January 31 to February 2, 2011, especially on Groundhog Day. During the initial stages of the storm, some meteorologists predicted that the system would affect over 100 million people in the United States. The storm brought cold air, heavy snowfall, blowing snow, and mixed precipitation on a path from New Mexico and northern Texas to New England and Eastern Canada. The Chicago area saw 21.2 inches (54 cm) of snow and blizzard conditions, with winds of over 60 mph (100 km/h). With such continuous winds, the blizzard continued to the north and affected Eastern and Atlantic Canada. Blizzard conditions affected many other large cities along the storm's path, including Tulsa, Oklahoma City, Kansas City, St. Louis, Springfield, El Paso, Las Cruces, Des Moines, Milwaukee, Detroit, Indianapolis, Dayton, Cleveland, New York City, New York's Capital District, and Boston. Many other areas not normally used to extreme winter conditions, including Albuquerque, Dallas and Houston, experienced significant snowfall or ice accumulation. The central Illinois National Weather Service in Lincoln, Illinois, issued only their fourth blizzard warning in the forecast office's 16-year history. Snowfall amounts of 20 to 28 inches (51 to 71 cm) were forecast for much of Northern and Western Illinois.

An ice storm ahead of the winter storm's warm front also brought hazardous conditions to much of the American Midwest and New England, and many areas saw well over 1 in (2.5 cm) of ice accumulation. Numerous power outages, flight cancellations, airport closures, road closures, roof collapses, rail and bus cancellations, mail stoppages, and school, government, and business closures took place ahead of and after the storm; many of these disruptions lasted several days. Several tornado touchdowns were reported in Texas and a tornado watch was issued for parts of Alabama, ahead of the cold front in the warm sector of the storm. In addition, thundersnow was recorded at some locations, including downtown Chicago. At least 36 deaths were reported to be related to the storm, many of them in shoveling or auto-related incidents, and the total damages were US $1.8 billion.

== Meteorological synopsis ==
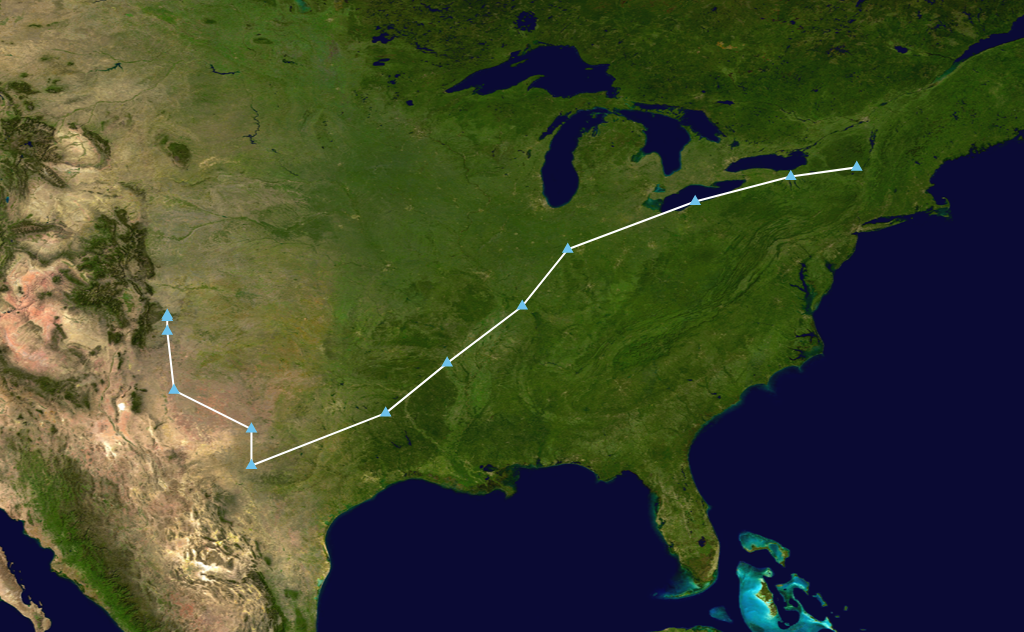
Map plotting the storm's track and intensity, according to the Saffir–Simpson scale Map key Saffir–Simpson scale Tropical depression (≤38 mph, ≤62 km/h) Tropical storm (39–73 mph, 63–118 km/h) Category 1 (74–95 mph, 119–153 km/h) Category 2 (96–110 mph, 154–177 km/h) Category 3 (111–129 mph, 178–208 km/h) Category 4 (130–156 mph, 209–251 km/h) Category 5 (≥157 mph, ≥252 km/h) Unknown Storm type Tropical cyclone Subtropical cyclone Extratropical cyclone, remnant low, tropical disturbance, or monsoon depression

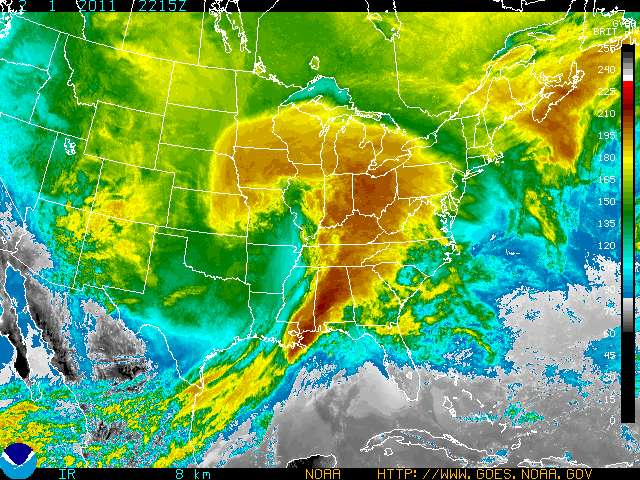
NOAA color-enhanced photograph of storm system on February 1, 2011.

A High-pressure system with a maximum pressure of 1,052 hectopascals (31.1 inHg) moved ahead of the storm, moving eastward across Montana. A low-pressure system from the Pacific Ocean later came ashore over Northern California and crossed the Rocky Mountains, merging with an Alberta clipper low and a developing Texas low, drawing moisture from the northwestern Gulf of Mexico. The storm later intensified and moved northeast, tanked, and developed a long warm front stretching toward the New England states, and moving northeast along this jet stream track.

Lake effect snow events started over Lake Ontario and Lake Michigan from northeasterly winds. Following the predominant jet pattern, the storm developed a very rapid forward trajectory and began to migrate toward the lower Great Lakes. The heaviest snow fell in a wide swath from central Oklahoma to Illinois, Indiana and the Ohio Valley. An official blizzard warning was issued in Southern Ontario for the first time since 1993, although the Canadian definition changed in 2010.

== Areas affected ==
=== Canada ===
==== Nova Scotia ====
Because the storm dumped some 40 centimetres (16 in) of snow in parts of Nova Scotia, and winds up to some 50 km/h (31 mph) to some areas in eastern Canada, schools and businesses were closed on Thursday morning, the 3rd of February. Lower Sackville near Halifax received 38 cm (15 in) of snow.

==== New Brunswick ====
Numerous school, bus and flight cancellations occurred in the province in preparation for the biggest winter storm during the winter of 2010–2011. A barn roof collapsed during the storm in the community of Baie Verte.

==== Ontario ====
The storm dropped 20–30 centimetres of snow over Southern Ontario. Hamilton saw more than 25 centimetres due to an intense Lake Effect band from the west end of Lake Ontario caused by an enhanced wind from the east-northeast, Toronto was spared more than was forecasted with 15 centimetres and a winter storm warning in effect. Areas from the Lake Huron shoreline east to London and Hamilton were under a blizzard warning. There were reports of thundersnow in Windsor, Ontario, when the storm began to hit the region Tuesday night on February 1; the city and nearby Chatham-Kent also declared a snow emergency, effectively enacting a parking ban to ease snowplow efforts, due to forecasted snow totals of 30+ centimetres, and the snow clean-up in the city is likely to cost $700,000 CAD, about 1.5 times more than normal. The Toronto District School Board and Toronto Catholic District School Board closed all schools for the first time since the Blizzard of 1999, a controversial decision given the less than anticipated outcome and snowfall totals resulting from the storm. Schools were also closed in the Windsor area and elsewhere.

==== Quebec ====
A traffic pile-up stretching three kilometres near Montreal, Quebec involving a school bus and many other vehicles sent 29 people to hospital for injuries. All schools in the Eastern Townships School Board near Sherbrooke were closed.

==== Newfoundland ====
Wind speeds exceeding 50 km/h (31 mph) hit areas near Clarenville and Bonavista, while schools in eastern parts of St. John's were closed.

=== Mexico ===
Northern Mexico suffered widespread infrastructure damage from the storm, and several weather-related deaths. In Chihuahua City, the temperature dropped to −18 °C (−1 °F) in Ciudad Juárez, which lies just across the border from El Paso, Texas, in the Mexican state of Chihuahua, a regional state of emergency was declared Tuesday evening, just ahead of the cold weather system, with Mexican authorities urging citizens to stay indoors. Despite the snow and ice that developed across the borderland, the major International Bridges remained open during the blizzard. Additionally, to help ease the electricity crash across Texas due to the freezing weather, Mexican officials arranged for the transfer of 280 megawatts of power to the United States via utility hookups located in Nuevo Laredo (across from Laredo, Texas) and Piedras Negras, Coahuila (near Eagle Pass, Texas). The cold wave behind the storm's cold front left temperatures plunging to −18 °C (0 °F) in the Ciudad Juárez metropolitan area, and in the mountains area plunging to −23 °C (−9 °F), resulting in the deaths of at least six people in the coldest temperatures recorded in the area in at least half a century. In addition, 35 animals died at a zoo, and closures of schools and factories occurred in the city.

On Wednesday, authorities in Juárez announced that convoys would be traveling out to remote regions and slum areas to ensure that citizens are warm and have the supplies they need to get through the next few days. On Thursday, Mexican officials suspended energy exports to Texas, citing cold weather damage at five power stations across Mexico that resulted in a total loss of 1,000 megawatts of electricity in Northern Mexico. Power stations in Mexico were able to meet the resulting energy demands in Northern Mexico, but could not spare additional electricity to aid Texas. In Juarez, overnight temperatures in the single digits left 90% of the city without water service due to frozen pipes, and the failure of thermoelectric generators at a power station in Samalayuca, 30 miles south of Juarez, left citizens without power for roughly five hours.

==== Nuevo León ====
In Monterrey, Nuevo León's capital city, the cold air killed many trees and other types of tropical plants. Snow was observed in the high peaks in the mountains and the fountain in the main Alameda park got frozen overnight.

=== United States ===
Animation showing the storm developing and moving across the U.S.

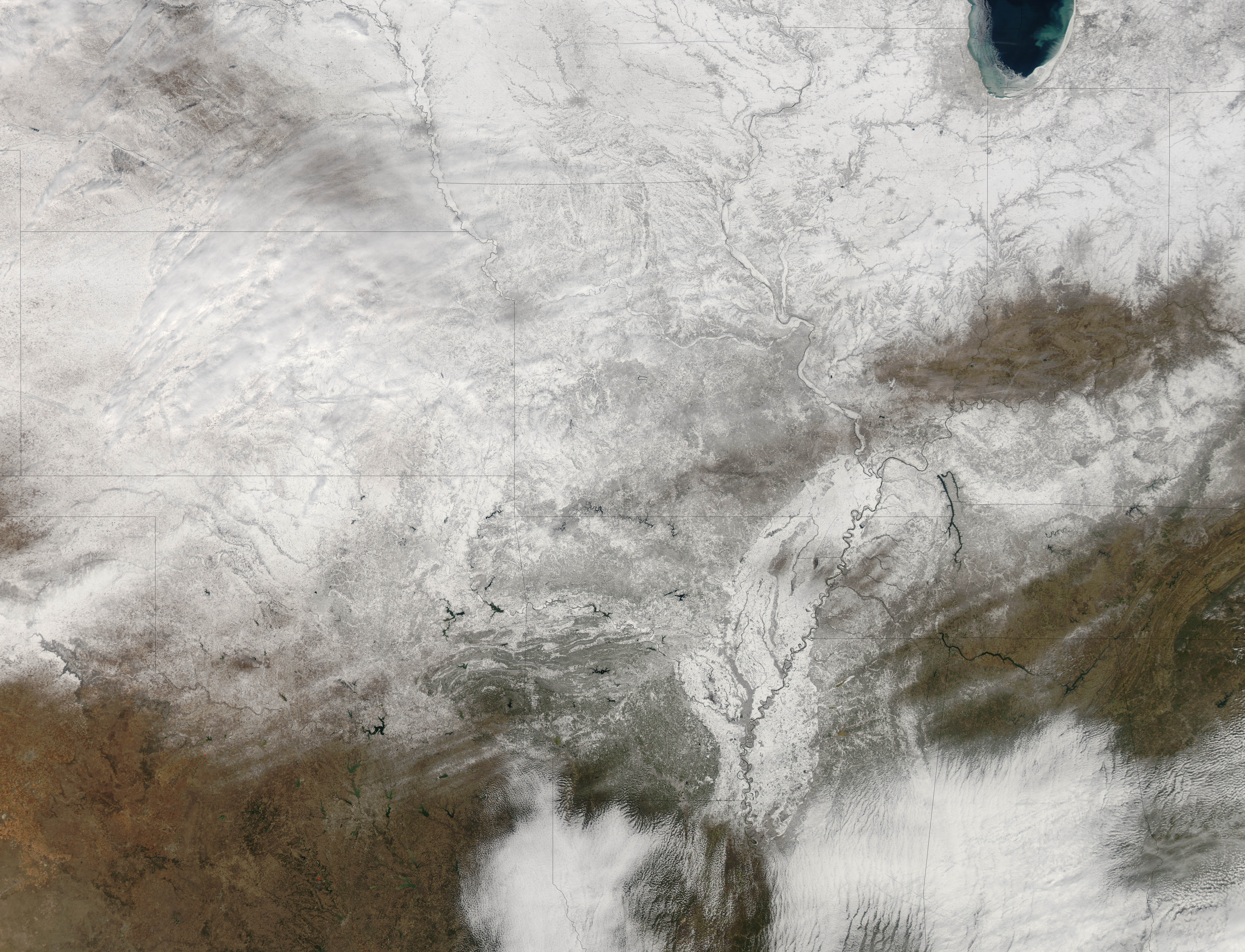
View of the U.S. midsection at 1:26 CST on February 10, 2011.

==== Connecticut ====
Connecticut experienced up to 10 inches (25 cm) of snow and 0.75 inches (1.9 cm) ice accumulations, resulting in widespread tree damage and power outages. The additional snow and ice accumulation on top of several feet of snow prior to the storm led to roof collapses in Bethany, Waterbury, and Middletown. The West Rock Tunnel on the Wilbur Cross Parkway was closed for several hours due to accidents caused by slippery conditions, while service was disrupted on the Metro-North Railroad and at Bradley International Airport. The heavy snow caused at least 136 roof collapses of barns, greenhouses and other farm structures.

==== Illinois ====
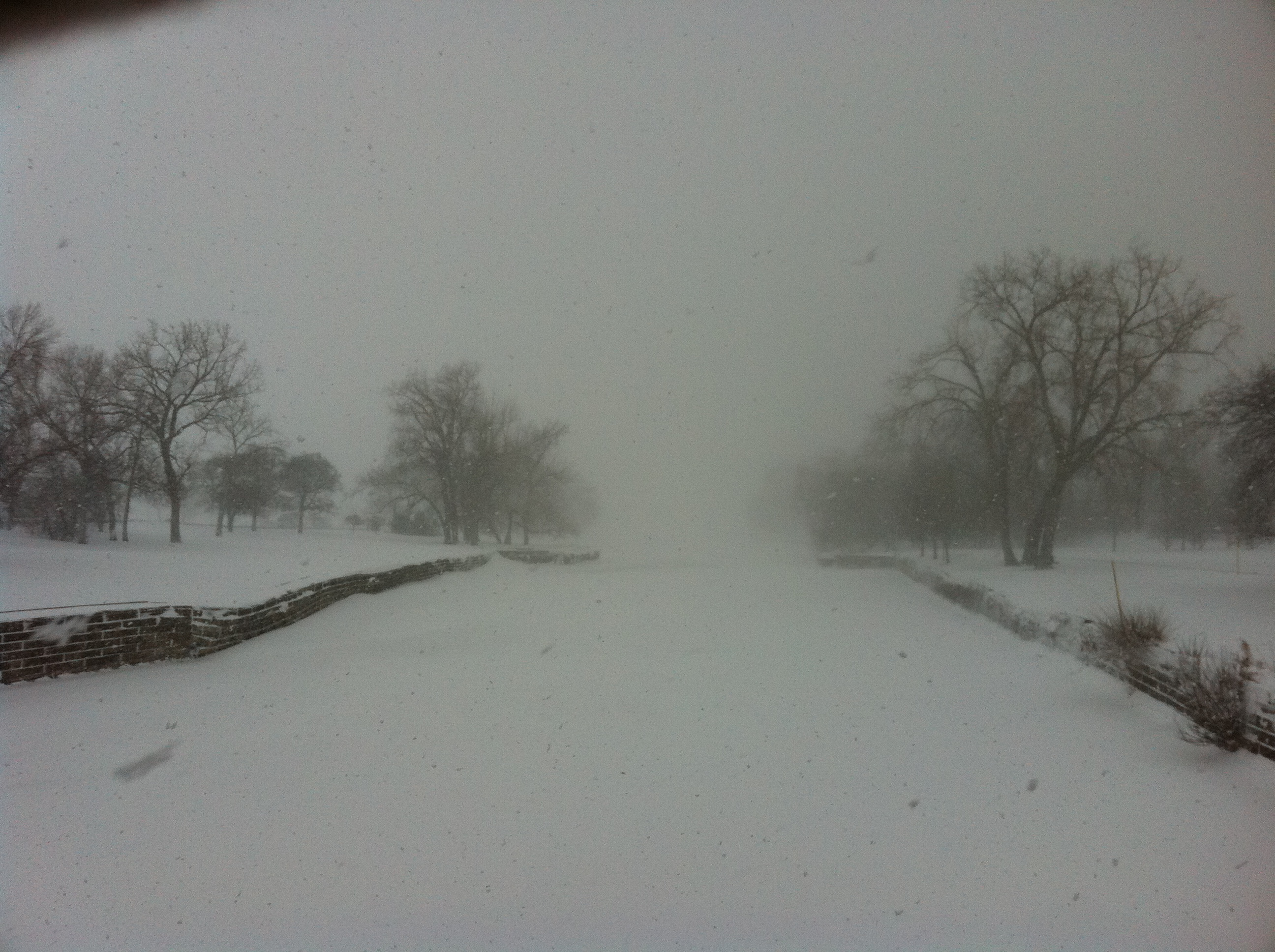
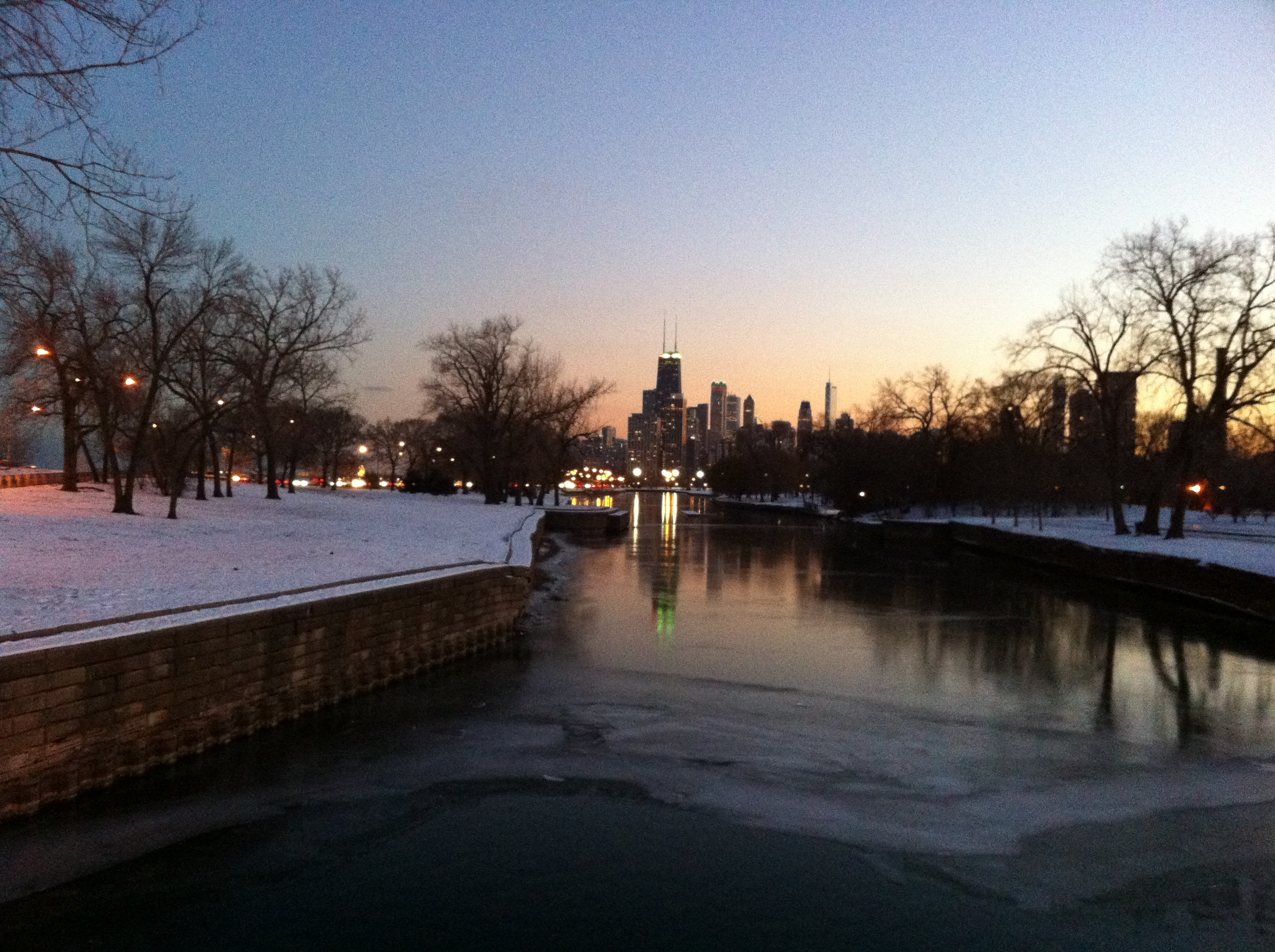
Chicago's Lincoln Park Lagoon looking south during the storm (left) and on a clear day for comparison

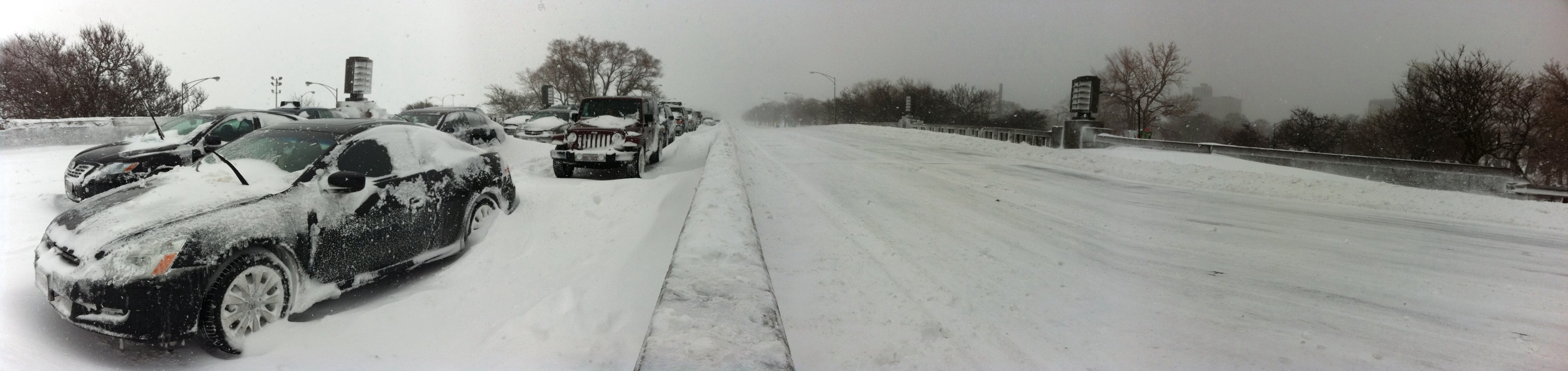
Chicago's Lake Shore Drive, with abandoned, snowed-in cars and empty lanes.

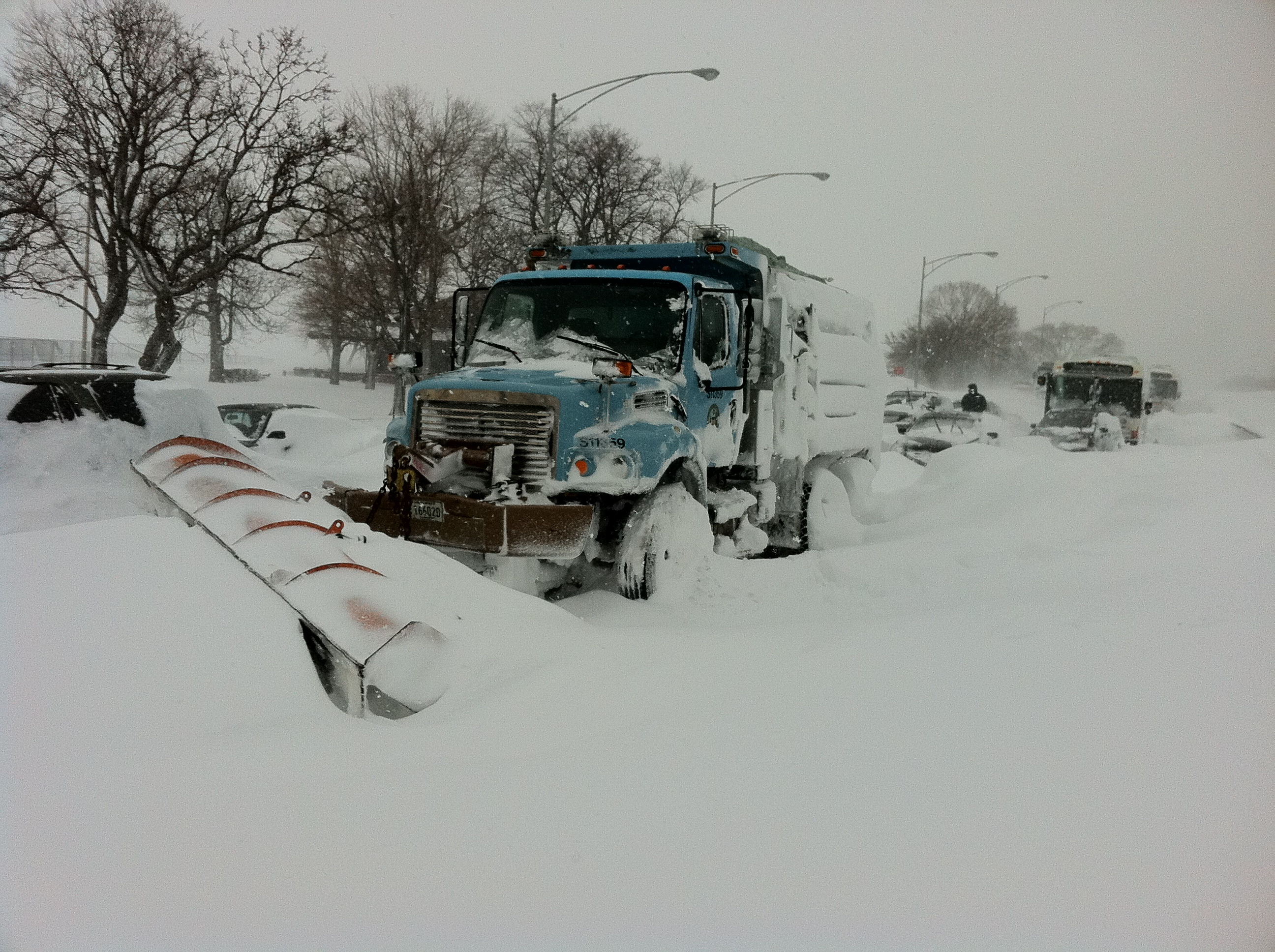
A Winter service vehicle abandoned and stuck on Lake Shore Drive during the storm.

Amateur video of cars stuck on Lake Shore Drive.

In Chicago, in anticipation of the imminent blizzard conditions, 1,300 flights were canceled at O'Hare and Midway airports. By 4:30pm, CST (22:30 GMT), the storm reached blizzard status with sustained winds exceeding 35 miles per hour (56 km/h), with white-out conditions being reported by spotters in the Old Town neighborhood on the city's North Side. while Lake Shore Drive was temporarily shut down due to impassable conditions. City officials said on February 2, that at least 900 cars and buses were stranded on Lake Shore Drive, with their drivers and passengers being trapped in some cases for as long as 12 hours (many drivers opting to stay with their cars in the false-fear of being ticketed for abandoning their vehicles instead of walking the short distance to the high-rise buildings lining the drive), but that closing the roadway earlier could have resulted in disastrous traffic conditions and possible accidents on other Chicago area streets. Tow trucks began pulling cars from Lake Shore Drive on the evening of February 2, and moving them into six temporary lots for motorists who abandoned their vehicles to arrive and claim. The city of Chicago was unable to keep track of the license plates for each vehicle, which led to complaints from many drivers and by the time they located their vehicles, many were unable to retrieve them from the lots because they were parked bumper-to-bumper.; on February 3, the City of Chicago reopened Lake Shore Drive to traffic before rush hour.

On February 1, the Chicago Public Schools announced that some schools would be closed and some would remain open on the following day (Wednesday, February 2), which marked the first district-wide cancellation of classes since the Blizzard of 1999. Heavy snow and high sustained winds gusting in excess of 50 miles per hour (80 km/h), caused rail switches to freeze on the CTA's Red Line and blew a portion of the roof off Wrigley Field. Northwestern University, Illinois Institute of Technology and the University of Chicago canceled classes Wednesday for the first time in over a decade due to the weather. Over 39,000 state workers were ordered not to come into work due to the weather; this was the largest figure since a blizzard in 1979. Mail service was stopped on Wednesday for six post office regions in Northern Illinois. Amtrak train service out of Chicago was also canceled across Illinois on Wednesday.

In the central part of the state, numerous municipalities were all but shut down by the storm. On Monday, residents rushed to the stores to stock up on groceries, and numerous stores reported record sales. On Tuesday, several school districts and universities pre-emptively canceled classes for Tuesday evening and all-day Wednesday. Many school districts planned to close a second day in a row, on Thursday. About 1.5 inches (3.8 cm) of snow fell Monday night. Tuesday afternoon brought heavy snowfall and sustained 40 miles per hour (64 km/h) winds, with gusts of over 50 miles per hour (80 km/h). Local government officials encouraged all businesses to close down, and local hospitals braced for the storm by preparing living and sleeping areas for essential personnel. Flights from area airports were canceled, and local officials repeatedly urged residents not to travel, since because of the whiteout conditions, snow plows had been taken off the roads. Interstate 80 was closed Tuesday night between Morris and Princeton. On Wednesday, I-290 and Illinois Route 53 were shut down from Lake Cook Road in Arlington Heights to St. Charles Road in Elmhurst. Forty vehicles were abandoned on Route 53. Parts of Interstate 57 were also shut down. The state police described most expressways as "impassable". 50 motorists stranded on Illinois Route 47 south of Huntley received assistance from a snowmobile club, while dozens of motorists had to be rescued on Illinois Route 72, west of Hampshire. During the storm's peak on Tuesday night, more than 100,000 customers were without electricity across the state, including 79,000 ComEd customers across Northern Illinois and 35,800 Ameren customers in Central Illinois. Several charities set up shelters for the homeless and those stranded by the blizzard, and Governor Pat Quinn mobilized 500 Illinois National Guard troops to help rescue stranded motorists. Hundreds of motorists had been rescued off Interstates 290, 55, 57, and 80. In addition, over 80 traffic accidents were reported.

11 snow-related deaths had been reported in Illinois by February 3. The body of an individual was recovered from Lake Michigan by Chicago Police. The pedestrian had reportedly been walking on a lake-front pathway when he had been blown into the lake by strong winds. In Grayslake, a man was killed in a crash while driving through the storm, while a woman in Mundelein died from hypothermia in her vehicle. A man in Chicago was also found dead in his home, which had no heat. In Barrington, a teacher died of a heart attack while leaving school on Tuesday. Five cardiac-related deaths from shoveling snow occurred in Lyons, Downers Grove, Mount Prospect, Carol Stream, and Glendale Heights. In rural LaSalle County, a man died while trying to walk through the storm after his vehicle was stranded on a rural road.

21.2 inches (54 cm) of snow fell at Chicago-O'Hare International Airport, supplanting the Chicago blizzard of 1979 with the third largest total snowfall in Chicago history, after the infamous Chicago Blizzard of 1967, and the Blizzard of 1999. 24 inches (61 cm) fell at the 1 N Abingdon mesonet site in Knox County, in West Central Illinois. This was the largest snowfall in the history of the mesonet. Drifts of 10 to 15 feet also occurred. Snowfall rates exceeded 4 inches per hour for a few hours on Tuesday evening as well along with thunder and lightning.

Additional official snowfall totals included 20.9 inches (53 cm) at Chicago-Midway International Airport, 16.4 inches at the National Weather Service office in Romeoville, and 14.3 inches (36 cm) at Chicago Rockford International Airport. The storm's highest total of 27 inches (69 cm) was reported in northwest suburban Roselle and Medinah, Illinois. Peak gusts during the blizzard included 61 miles per hour (98 km/h) at O'Hare and 67 miles per hour (108 km/h) along the lakefront.

==== Indiana ====
Near Wheatfield, a teenage boy and a hitchhiker he picked up were killed during the blizzard when a semi crashed into the compact car they were driving in. Central Indiana saw ice, followed by snow and high winds, which gusted over 50 miles per hour (80 km/h). A peak of 50,000 Duke Energy customers were without power due to the storm, including nearly half of the Purdue University campus at one point. A 57-year-old South Haven resident collapsed and died after clearing snow from his driveway. The city of Indianapolis received nearly a half inch of ice from the blizzard, effectively paralyzing the city and leaving many without power.

==== Iowa ====
Southeastern Iowa saw up to 18.5 inches (47 cm) of snow. The heaviest snow fell in the eastern half of the state. Des Moines fared slightly better, where only 6.5 inches (17 cm) fell. Some roads remained closed on Wednesday night, and over the course of the storm, state troopers responded to 151 accidents and assisted 428 motorists.

==== Kansas ====
In Kansas, 53 counties were declared disaster areas. Especially hard hit were eastern sections of the state, which saw over a foot of snow and whiteout conditions. Government offices and the state legislature were closed on Wednesday, but expected to reopen on Thursday. At least two deaths were blamed on the storm.

==== Maryland ====
Baltimore received freezing rain during the day on February 1, which changed to rain as temperatures rose on February 2, and the overall icing in that region was less than expected.

==== Michigan ====
A 73-year-old Dansville man was killed in a vehicle crash. Universities that closed due to the snow include Western Michigan University, Kendall College of Art and Design, Grand Valley State University, Michigan State University, University of Michigan Flint, University of Michigan Dearborn, Wayne State University and Central Michigan University.

==== Missouri ====
In Missouri, a state of emergency was declared by Governor Jay Nixon, who activated the Missouri National Guard. On February 1, Interstate 70, which runs east–west from St. Louis to Kansas City, the entire width of Missouri, was closed by the Missouri Department of Transportation due to white-out conditions and increasing snowfall. It was the first time in Missouri history that any interstate was closed across the entire state.

Kansas City was under a blizzard warning for only the 2nd time since 1980, and only the 3rd time in its entire history. Columbia experienced the town's first blizzard warning with this storm in their history.

Many local school districts canceled classes, the University of Missouri shut down for an unprecedented three successive days. The University of Central Missouri in Warrensburg, Missouri (which received 23 inches of snow, which in turn broke the all-time record for the town for snowfall in one day) was closed an unprecedented three days as well. A scheduled St. Louis Blues hockey game on February 1 was postponed until the 22nd. Areas of Missouri also reported significant sleet accumulation. In St. Louis, some MetroLink service was suspended due to ice on the rails. Several malls were closed due to ice in the parking lots. One person in central Missouri was killed during the storm.

==== New Jersey ====
In New Jersey, snow, rain and ice were all problems. In central New Jersey Ice storm warnings were put into effect. In portions of northern New Jersey, the forecast called for 12 inches (30 cm) of snow and over 1 inch (2.5 cm) of ice. The roads were slippery and it was hard for cars to maneuver on the roadways.

==== New Mexico ====
Up to 24 inches (61 cm) of snow fell in the Sangre de Cristo, and the Central Mountain Chain of New Mexico, while up to 6 inches fell in the Albuquerque Metro Area. The heaviest snowfall totals were 23 inches (58 cm) at the Santa Fe Ski Area. A 180 mi (290 km) stretch of Interstate 25 was closed between Las Cruces and Belen due to strong winds, icy roads and blowing snow. On Thursday evening, Governor Susana Martinez declared a state of emergency across southern New Mexico, due to the steadily decreasing natural gas supply brought about by the catastrophic failure of the El Paso Electric Company's power grid. All-time record cold temperatures were tied or broken in Santa Fe and Ruidoso after the storm.

==== New York ====
New York City received almost an inch of ice from freezing rain during the night of 1–2 February, causing public transportation on both bus routes and the Long Island Rail Road to be either delayed or shut down entirely. One Long Island resident was killed by a fire sparked by cooking fuel during the storm.

==== Ohio ====
Ohio was on the warm sector of the low-pressure system. On the night of January 31 – February 1, the Cleveland and Akron area received a Winter Storm Warning from the NWS Cleveland Field Office for snow and freezing rain. On Monday night 3–6 inches (7.6–15.2 cm) of snow fell during the pre-frontal warm front. During the overnight hours of February 1–2, as the center of low pressure moved from Missouri to lower Indiana, it carried a warm front, with warm air advection and a shallow cold air pool at the bottom. This led to freezing rain in parts of Northeast Ohio. In Canton ice accretion ranged from 0.5 to 0.75 inches (1.3 to 1.9 cm), which led to power lines and trees crashing, leaving almost 40,000 people without power. In the Greater Cleveland area, there was 0.1 inch of ice accretion and scattered outages in the Cleveland suburbs of North Royalton, where 2,000 people lost power, and also in parts of Garfield Heights and Maple Heights. Scattered outages were reported in other parts of the area.

In the Dayton area, an Ohio Highway Trooper and his wife died from carbon monoxide poisoning from a running generator that built up gas in their home after the home lost power.

==== Oklahoma ====
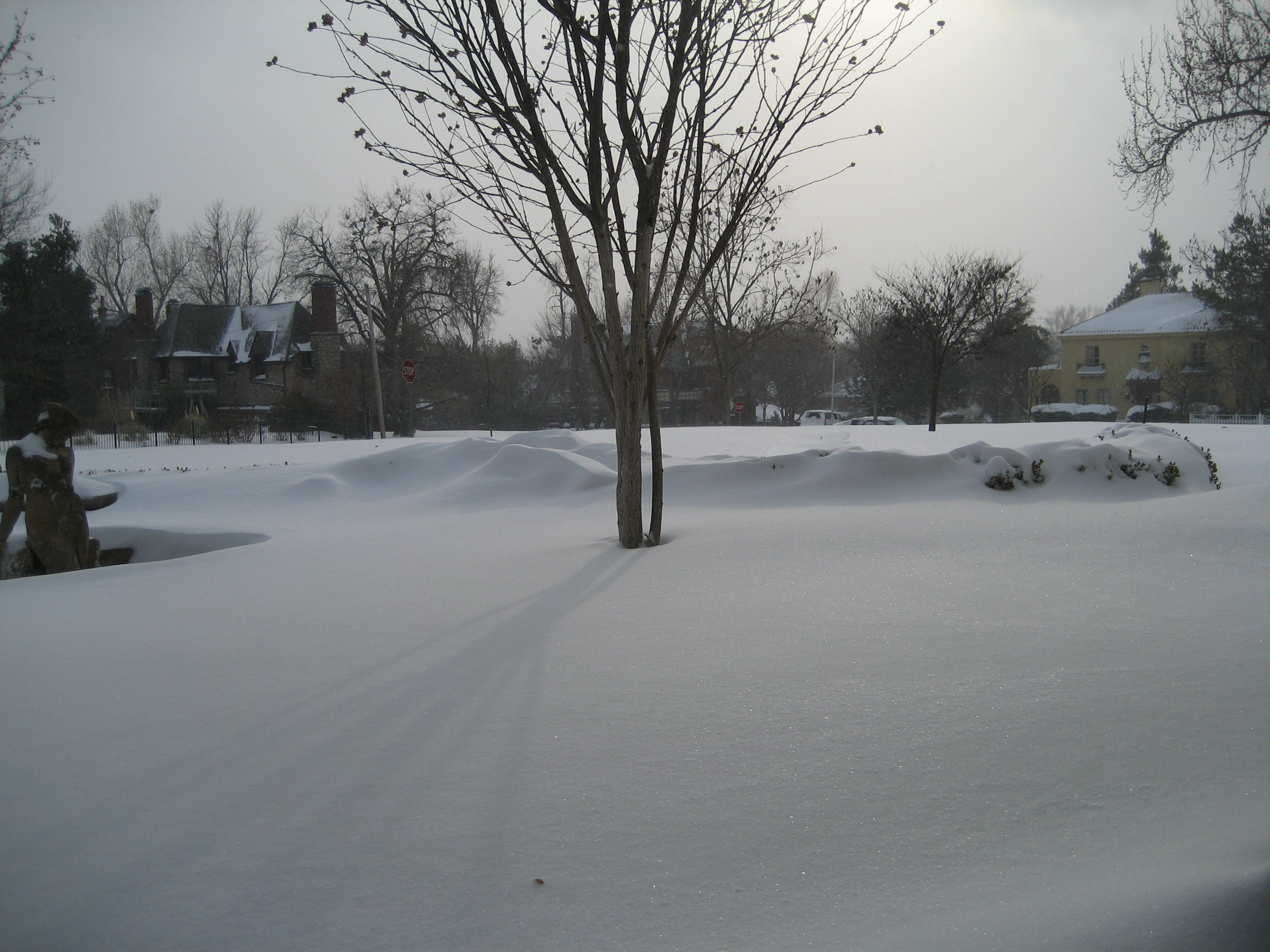
In Tulsa, the storm set an all-time snowfall record.

The heavy snowfall, along with sleet and some freezing rain, began developing over Oklahoma and the Texas panhandle on the evening of January 31, with a state of emergency declared by Governor Mary Fallin earlier that day. As a result of the emergency declaration, a state law prohibiting price increases of more than 10 percent on most goods and services during and for 30 days after an emergency declaration went into effect, and will remain in effect for 180 days after the declaration order for prices of repairs, remodeling and construction. The Salvation Army of Central Oklahoma opened three shelters and one warming station for those stranded by the storm outdoors, the homeless, and those who lost power during the storm; two in Oklahoma City, one in Norman and one in El Reno, with teams from the Oklahoma chapter of the American Red Cross placed on standby. Will Rogers World Airport in Oklahoma City and Tulsa International Airport were closed, with Will Rogers remaining closed for 20 hours; I-44 from Stroud to the Missouri state line, Interstate 40 near Okemah and westbound lanes of I-40 east of Henryetta were among many major highways closed, and the Indian Nation, Creek and Muskogee turnpikes were all either closed entirely or in stretches.

Most school districts in the state including the Oklahoma City and Tulsa public school districts, as well as most Oklahoma City government offices were shut down a day in advance of the storm. The United States Postal Service released a statement saying that it was attempting to make deliveries across the state but that "some areas may be undeliverable", due to the heavy snow and very low visibility; mail delivery in Oklahoma City did not occur in most areas due to the conditions. Temperatures across the state on February 1 and 2nd hovered in the single digits to mid-teens. Winds gusted to near 60 miles per hour (97 km/h) at times creating ground blizzard conditions across the eastern half of the state; wind chill values dropped as low as −36 °F (−38 °C) in Boise City, the lowest recorded wind chill in the state since the deployment of the Oklahoma Mesonet. Heavy snow caved in the roof of a building on the Hard Rock Hotel & Casino complex in Tulsa containing a poker room and electronic casino games, the damage was confined to an area that was part of the original structure built in 1992. There was no one injured as a result of the roof collapse as no people were in the affected area at the time; the hotel towers, a concert venue, a convention center, and retail operations at the complex were unaffected and remained open. The Tulsa World newspaper canceled its print editions on February 2, 3 and 4, citing the heavy snowfall and hazardous road conditions that could compromise the safety of their newspaper carriers, making it the first time in the newspaper's 111-year history that the print edition had to be canceled; however, the newspaper did continue to publish its electronic editions on its website. A section of a boat dock at the Tera Miranda Marina Resort on the Monkey Island arm of Grand Lake collapsed due to significant snow accumulations on its roof, destroying four boats valued at about $450,000.

Will Rogers World Airport recorded an estimated 11.6 inches (29 cm) of snow, smashing the all-time daily snowfall record for February for Oklahoma City (the previous record was 6.5 inches (17 cm) on February 7, 1986). Tulsa also set an all-time daily and monthly snowfall record for the storm that month, as the Tulsa International Airport received 14 inches (36 cm) of accumulated snowfall (the previous February snowfall record for the city of Tulsa was 10.5 inches (27 cm) in February 2003, and the previous record for snowfall in a single 24-hour period in Tulsa was 12.9 inches (33 cm) on March 8–9, 1994). Owasso, Oklahoma received the most snowfall accumulation in Oklahoma with 21 inches (53 cm). Ironically days earlier on January 29, wildfires had burned parts of central and south-central Oklahoma, and ten central and south-central Oklahoma counties were placed under a burn ban due to very dry, wildfire-prone conditions. State Insurance Commissioner John Doak issued an emergency order to allow licensed claims adjustors outside of Oklahoma to help assess damages and losses from the storm for 90 days. On February 2, Governor Fallin asked the White House to approve an emergency disaster declaration request for all 77 Oklahoma counties. In a statement by Fallin, state and local governments would receive 75% reimbursement for expenses associated with responding to the storm if the declaration is approved, including overtime costs, costs associated with operating shelters and clearing snow and ice-covered roads. That evening, President Barack Obama granted Fallin's federal emergency request, authorizing the Department of Homeland Security and FEMA to coordinate disaster relief efforts in the state of Oklahoma.

Oklahoma State University held its home basketball game on February 2 against the University of Missouri as scheduled, despite the difficulty the Missouri team had arriving in Stillwater due to the blizzard. As a result of the storm, the university provided free tickets to fans who were able to attend the game at Gallagher-Iba Arena, which Oklahoma State won in a 76-70 upset against the #15 Tigers.

The storm system has caused at least three deaths in Oklahoma, one in a sledding accident and two in an auto crash. On February 1, a 20-year-old Oklahoma City woman died due to injuries suffered in a sledding accident near Lake Stanley Draper, in which the sled being pulled by a vehicle veered off the road, flinging the woman into a guardrail; she was pronounced dead at the scene. Two days later as slick road conditions continued across parts of the state, a truck carrying eight people ran off of a bridge and fell into the Spring River (which had been covered in ice), on I-44 in Ottawa County near Miami, killing two people; one of two westbound lanes of I-44 was reopened to traffic the previous evening after blizzard conditions made it impassible.

==== Pennsylvania ====
In portions of Pennsylvania north of Philadelphia, ice storm warnings were put into effect. The storm dropped several inches of sleet and snow in the Poconos and included a long period of freezing rain that produced ice accretions of up to half an inch in the Lehigh Valley and the Philadelphia suburbs. The ice tore down numerous tree limbs, trees, and subsequently, power lines.

Precipitation started as snow across the region during the early morning of the 1st. As warmer air moved in aloft, the precipitation changed to sleet and freezing rain by the morning rush in the local Philadelphia area, a mixture of sleet and freezing rain by the end of the morning commute in Berks County and the Lehigh Valley and a wintry mix late in the morning in the Poconos. Precipitation tapered off to mainly freezing drizzle during the afternoon and early evening of the 1st. Heavier precipitation moved in again during the evening of the 1st and fell as freezing rain in the Philadelphia suburbs, a mixture of sleet and freezing rain in Berks County and the Lehigh Valley and mainly a snow and sleet mixture in the Poconos. Overnight colder air moved in aloft in over the Poconos and precipitation changed back to all snow for a few hours. Toward sunrise on the 2nd, this process started to reverse at both the surface and aloft. Warmer air was moving north again and the freezing rain changed to plain rain across the Philadelphia suburbs and Berks County around 8 a.m. EST and the Lehigh Valley around 9 a.m. EST. In the Poconos, precipitation changed to freezing rain around 7 a.m. EST and ended as freezing rain around 11 a.m. EST on the 2nd. Representative snow and sleet accumulations included 5.4 inches (14 cm) in Tobyhanna (Monroe County), 5 inches (13 cm) in Pocono Summit (Monroe County), 3.5 inches (8.9 cm) in Delaware Water Gap (Monroe County), 2.1 inches (5.3 cm) at the Lehigh Valley International Airport, 1.5 inches (3.8 cm) in Albrightsville (Carbon County) and 1 inch (2.5 cm) in Easton and Martins Creek (Northampton County). Representative ice accretions included 0.5 inches (1.3 cm) in Glenmoore (Chester County), Spring Mount (Montgomery County) and Emmaus (Lehigh County), 0.4 inches (1.0 cm) in East Nantmeal (Chester County) and Lansdale (Montgomery County), 0.38 inches (1.0 cm) in Kutztown (Berks County) and Allentown (Lehigh County), 0.33 inches (0.8 cm) in Feasterville (Bucks County) and 0.25 inches (0.6 cm) in Bangor (Northampton County).

Many trees still had snow on them from the winter storm of the previous week to exacerbate the damage. Nearly 300,000 power outages occurred. PECO Energy reported about 185,000 of its southeastern Pennsylvania customers lost power. Power was not completely restored to the last few until the afternoon of the 6th. Pennsylvania Power and Light reported about 79,000 of their customers lost power in Eastern and Central Pennsylvania; while Metropolitan Edison reported around 14,000 of its customers lost power in Berks County. Numerous schools cancelled classes on both the 1st and 2nd. Recycling and garbage pick-ups were delayed. This winter storm added additional strains to snow removal budgets and tight salt supplies. Reading, Hamburg, Boyertown, Birdsboro, Barto, Bechtelsville and Douglassville all suffered power outages. In Bucks County, downed wires in Milford caused a basement fire in one home on Sleepy Hollow Road. In Montgomery County, the worst reported tree and ice damage occurred in Lansdale and Hatfield. A utility pole fire in Pottstown knocked out power to the borough's water treatment plant. There were over 100 reports of downed wires throughout Northampton County.

In Northampton and Lehigh County, numerous crashes occurred on U.S. Route 22, Pennsylvania State Route 33 and Interstate 78. On Interstate 78, a driver swerved to avoid hitting a plow truck and was injured. In Bethlehem, a driver was injured after his vehicle rolled over on Schoenersville Road. Also in Bethlehem, a 100-foot section of a porch roof collapsed on the evening of the 2nd on Glendale Avenue from the weight of ice and snow. Three vehicles were damaged. In Berks County, Pennsylvania State Routes 345 (near Birdsboro) and 625 (south of Reading) were closed. In Chester County, there were several slip and fall injuries reported, mainly on the 1st. Just east of Exton, Northbound U.S. Route 202 was closed between Pennsylvania State Routes 30 and 401 because of an accident with injuries on the 2nd. Two roadways were closed because of downed trees and wires in North Coventry Township. One roadway was also closed in West Vincent Township.

==== Texas ====
In Texas the storm caused widespread disruption of road and air traffic, including flights into and out of Dallas/Fort Worth International Airport and Love Field. Rolling blackouts were instituted across the state as high demand for electricity left the power grid overloaded and unable to handle the demand. Governor Rick Perry asked for citizens to conserve as much electricity as they can to help ease the overloaded power grids. ERCOT, the governing body responsible for most of the electricity distribution in Texas, reported that more than 75% of the state was affected by rolling blackouts on February 2; at one point demand for energy was so great that utility companies began to purchase electricity off the national grids to meet the demand. Parts of Texas were expected to experience additional rolling blackouts Wednesday and Thursday as workers labored to get the electric systems back up and running. Post-analysis indicated that the cold temperatures had caused over 150 generators to encounter difficulties; loss of supply, instrumentation failures, and gas well-head freezing were some of the source causes.

Throughout the Dallas–Fort Worth metroplex, multiple large school districts were closed for a record-setting 5 days in a row, letting students out a whole week because of road hazards due to ice and snow. An ice storm affected areas as far south as Houston behind the main storm front, while three men were killed near Houston in traffic accidents. The storm adversely affected activities in the week leading up to Super Bowl XLV, which was played at Cowboys Stadium in Arlington, Texas.

The storm caused a failure at a water treatment plant near Donna, Texas, prompting officials to issue a boil water advisory.

In El Paso, Texas, the storm left major roadways slippery with ice and snow, and the abrupt demands placed on El Paso's utility services resulted in sporadic reports of loss of water and natural gas capability. Freezing temperatures, including the coldest high temperature on record in the city, resulted in the total failure of both of the city's natural gas power plants, resulting in rolling blackouts across the city. The loss of power had a ripple effect across the region, as the power failure left water and gas utilities without the power needed to operate pumps to move the water and natural gas to customers. This resulted in the complete cancellation of activities at all area independent school districts and institutions of higher education on Wednesday, Thursday, Friday, and the following Monday. In total, nearly 200,000 El Paso Electric customers went without power at some point as a result of the storm, while 1,200 Texas Gas Service customers went without gas. Over 157 water main breaks due to cold temperatures were reported to the El Paso Water Utilities, which when combined with the frozen water pumping equipment and abnormally high demand for water left El Paso water reservoirs dangerously low. Stage 2 mandatory water restrictions, which permit the use of water for drinking only, were implemented Monday night as the water utility worked to raise the water levels in the reservoirs, and on Wednesday the water restrictions were lifted. That same Wednesday it was announced that federal and state officials would conduct an investigation into El Paso Electric as a result of the spectacular failure of the utility during the blizzard.

==== Wisconsin ====
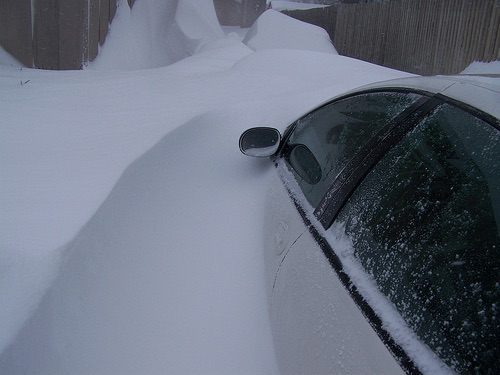
Accumulation covering car in Pleasant Prairie, Wisconsin

In Wisconsin, Governor Scott Walker declared a state of emergency in 29 Wisconsin counties due to the snowstorm, and deployed 75 Wisconsin National Guard soldiers. Early on February 2, the state's emergency management agency issued a Civil Danger Warning warning drivers completely off the roads at the risk of being stranded due to dangerous conditions forcing county plows, law enforcement and salters off the roads, a declaration distributed via NOAA Weather Radio's Emergency Alert System and local media outlets, and otherwise only issued for other major events such as terrorist attacks and water contamination emergencies. The same warning was issued hours later completely disallowing travel within Lake County, Illinois. Interstate 94 and Interstate 43 south of Milwaukee to the state line were both closed for a time due to dangerous conditions and many stranded vehicles.

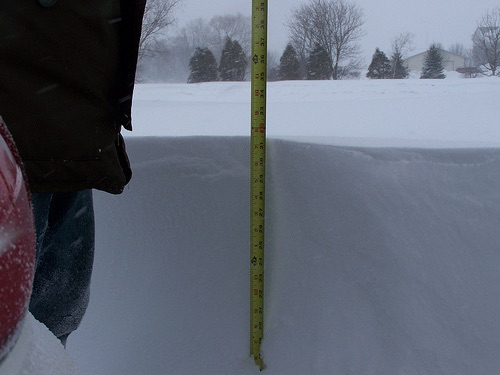
The measurement of a snow accumulation in Pleasant Prairie, Wisconsin

Nearly all government buildings, schools, and public facilities were closed for February 2, 2011 in the southeastern region of the state, including Milwaukee, Waukesha, Racine, Kenosha, Sheboygan, and Madison, with Racine and Kenosha receiving the largest amount of snow, just shy of 24 inches. Three people died of cardiac-related illnesses while clearing snow in Milwaukee.

== Non-winter weather events ==
=== High winds ===
Strong gale-force winds were expected in many areas, especially places northwest of the Appalachian Mountains. A storm warning for the entirety of Lake Michigan went up on 1 February, replacing an existing gale warning. Sustained winds of 39 to 55 mph (63 to 89 km/h) and gusts to 70 mph (110 km/h) or higher were reported over portions of Illinois, Wisconsin, and Lake Michigan for several hours at the height of the storm according to the National Weather Service.

=== Flash freeze ===
Parts of Texas and Louisiana east to the Mississippi Valley and Florida Panhandle experienced or were to experience rapid drops in temperature and flash freeze events after the squall line moved through.

=== Storm surge ===
Localized flooding occurred in northeastern Illinois, near the coast of Lake Michigan where strong winds brought storm surge and lakeshore flooding.

=== Severe thunderstorms and tornadoes ===
Severe thunderstorms erupted in many areas of the Midwest and Southeastern United States. Thunderstorms accompanied both heavy rain and snow. Tornadoes were reported in Texas, and a tornado watch was issued for parts of Alabama. An EF1 tornado damaged two homes in Rusk County, Texas.

== Impact ==
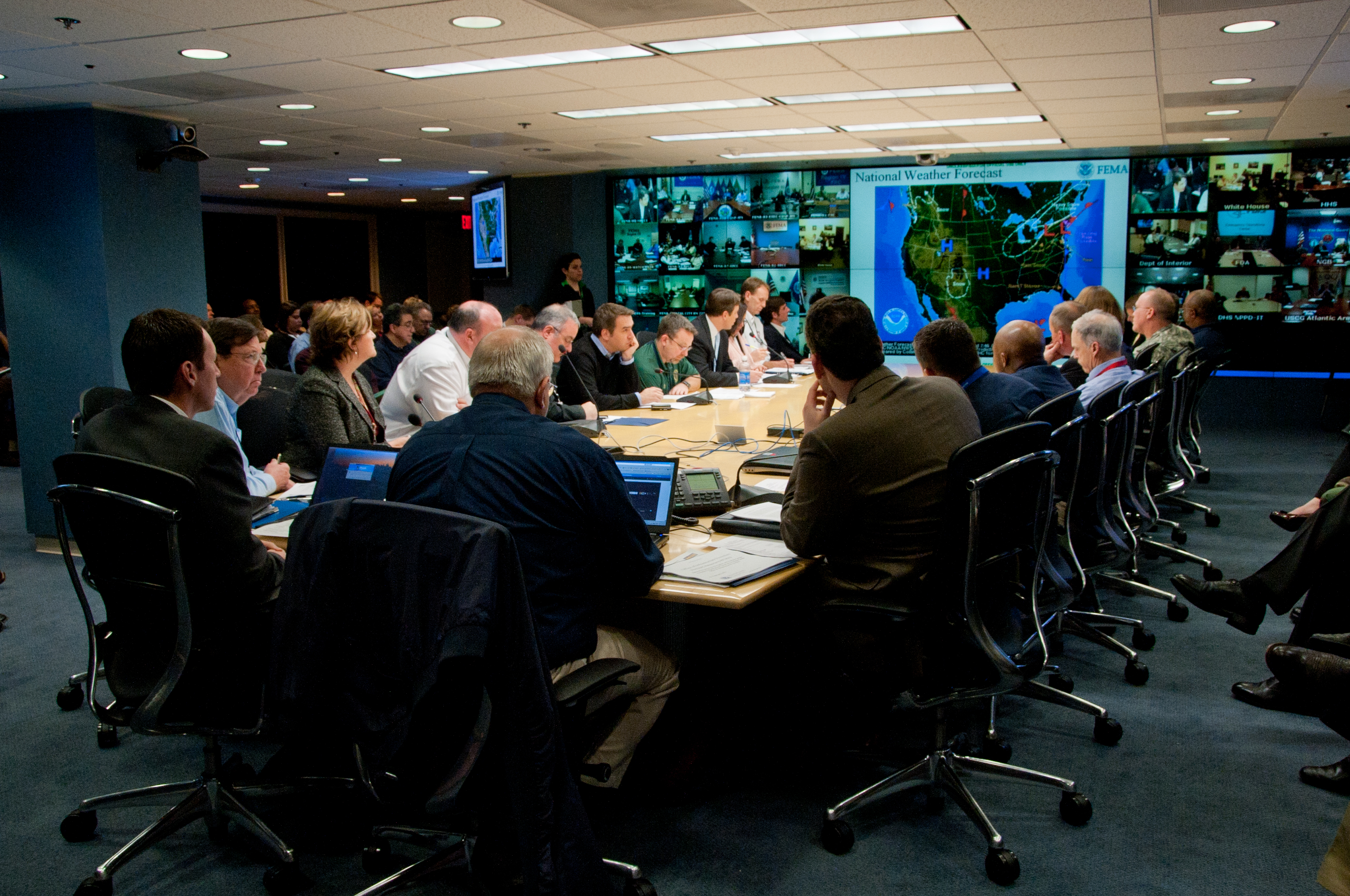
Washington, DC, February 2, 2011 -- FEMA Administrator Craig Fugate (center, back to camera) and senior officials discuss the response to the massive winter storm affecting a large part of the nation during a videoteleconference with regional and federal partners at FEMA's National Response Coordination Center.

=== Preparations ===
Local governments ahead of the storm prepared residents on procedures to follow during the storm. This included parking and driving restrictions and preparation of road clearing equipment. Street clearing crews applied chemicals to the roadways to pre-melt ice and snow and checked equipment prior to the event.

=== States of emergency ===
A state of emergency was declared in several American states, including Illinois, Oklahoma, and Missouri.

=== Airport traffic ===
At least 6,400 flight cancellations occurred across North America before the storm. Impact was severe at Chicago's O'Hare International Airport, as over 1,100 flights were canceled there. A less severe but still a major impact was at Toronto Pearson International Airport in Toronto where about 300 of its 1,400 daily flights were canceled.

By the end of February 2, at least 13,000 individual flight cancellations had taken place across North America.

=== Power outages ===
Many local and widespread power outages affected locations along the storm track, including in Illinois, Ohio, Oklahoma, New Mexico, Indiana, Texas, Colorado and Kentucky.

=== Impact on Super Bowl XLV ===
The storm affected the Dallas, Texas area, bringing a coating of ice to the ground after a rapid freeze. This caused some damage ahead of Super Bowl XLV. Snow falling from the roof of Cowboys Stadium caused several injuries.

== Gallery ==
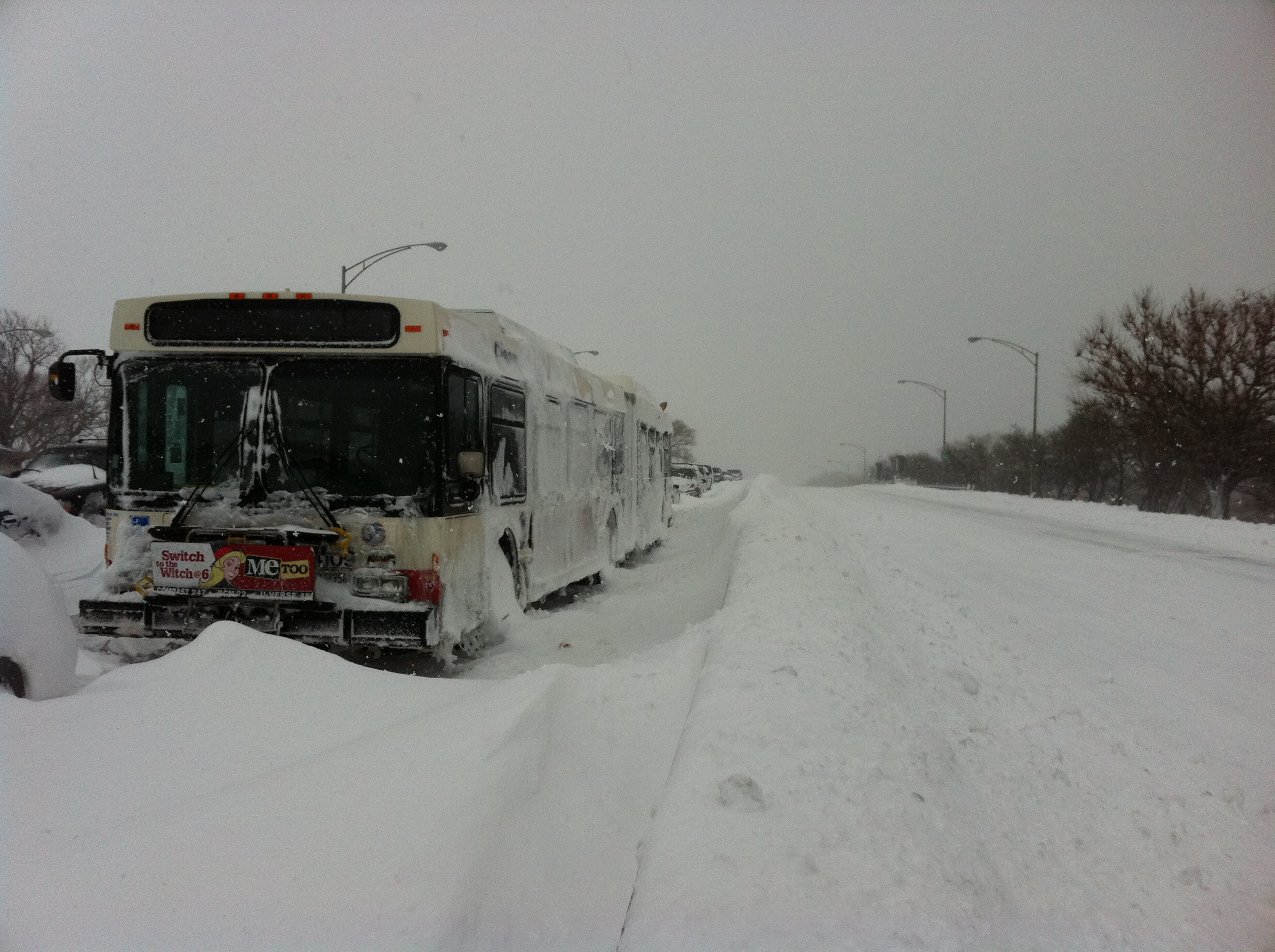
Abandoned CTA bus on Lake Shore Drive

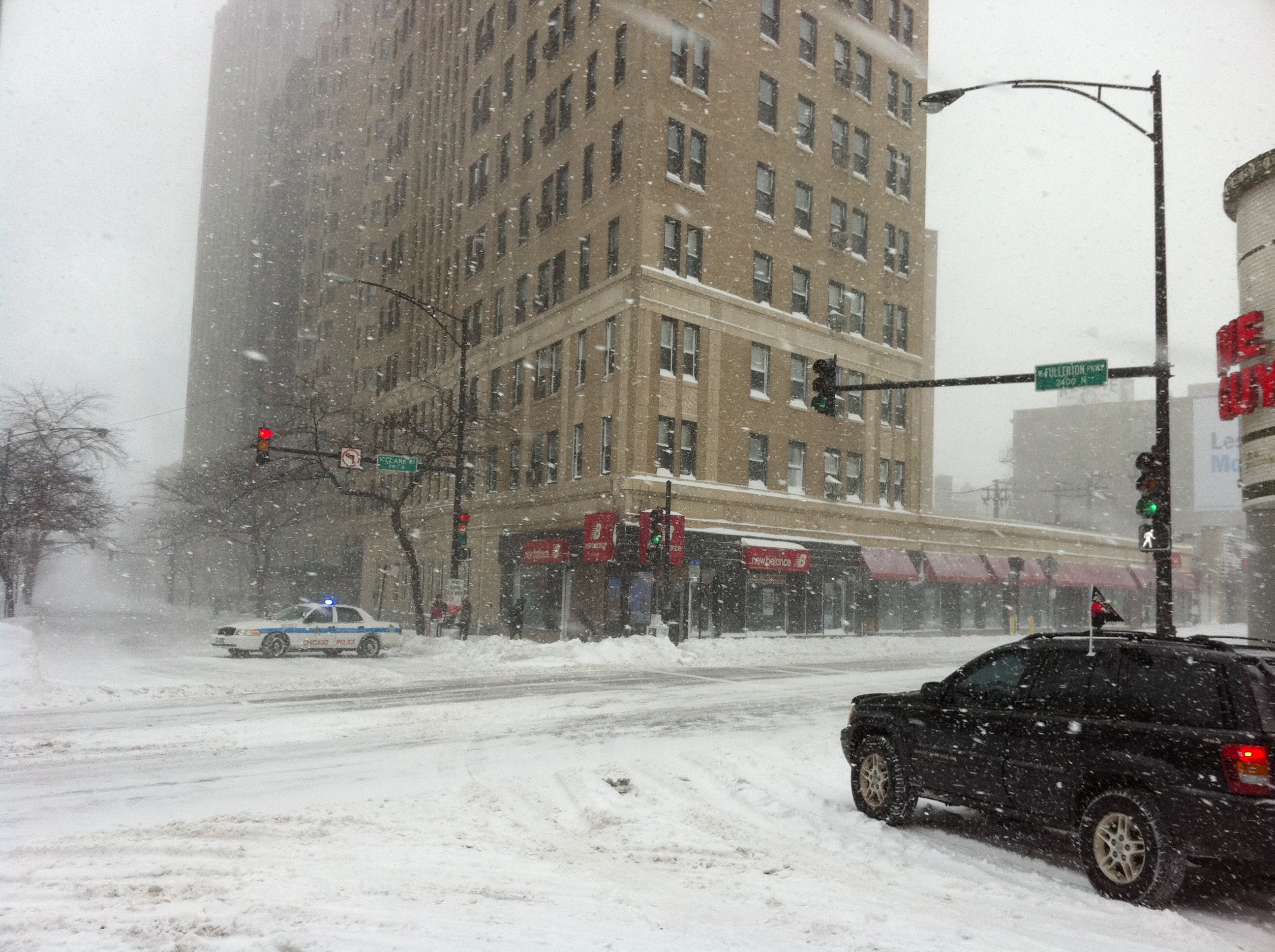
Fullerton Ave. and Clark St. blocked by the Chicago Police during the storm

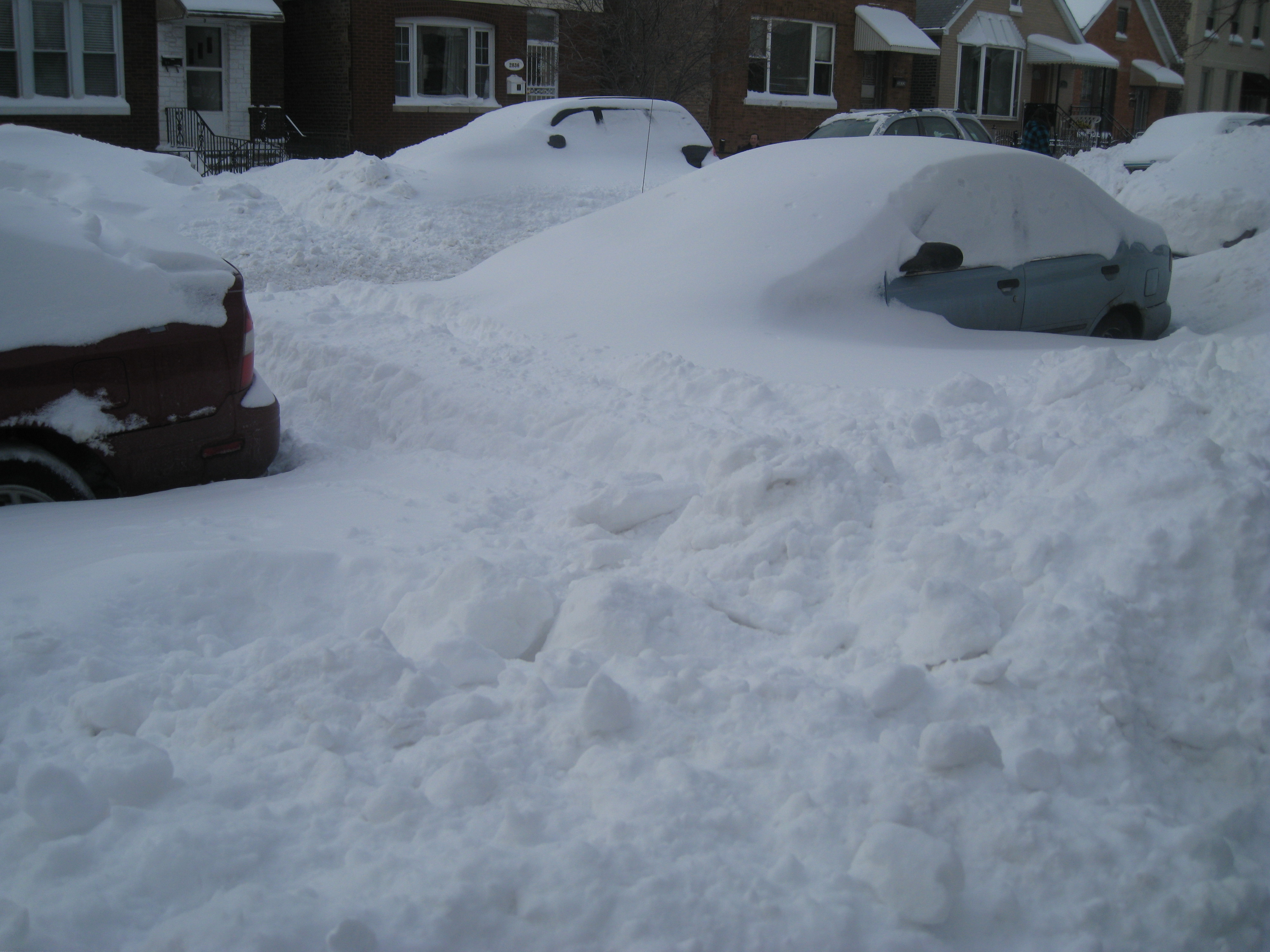
Cars buried in the Bridgeport neighborhood on Chicago's South Side

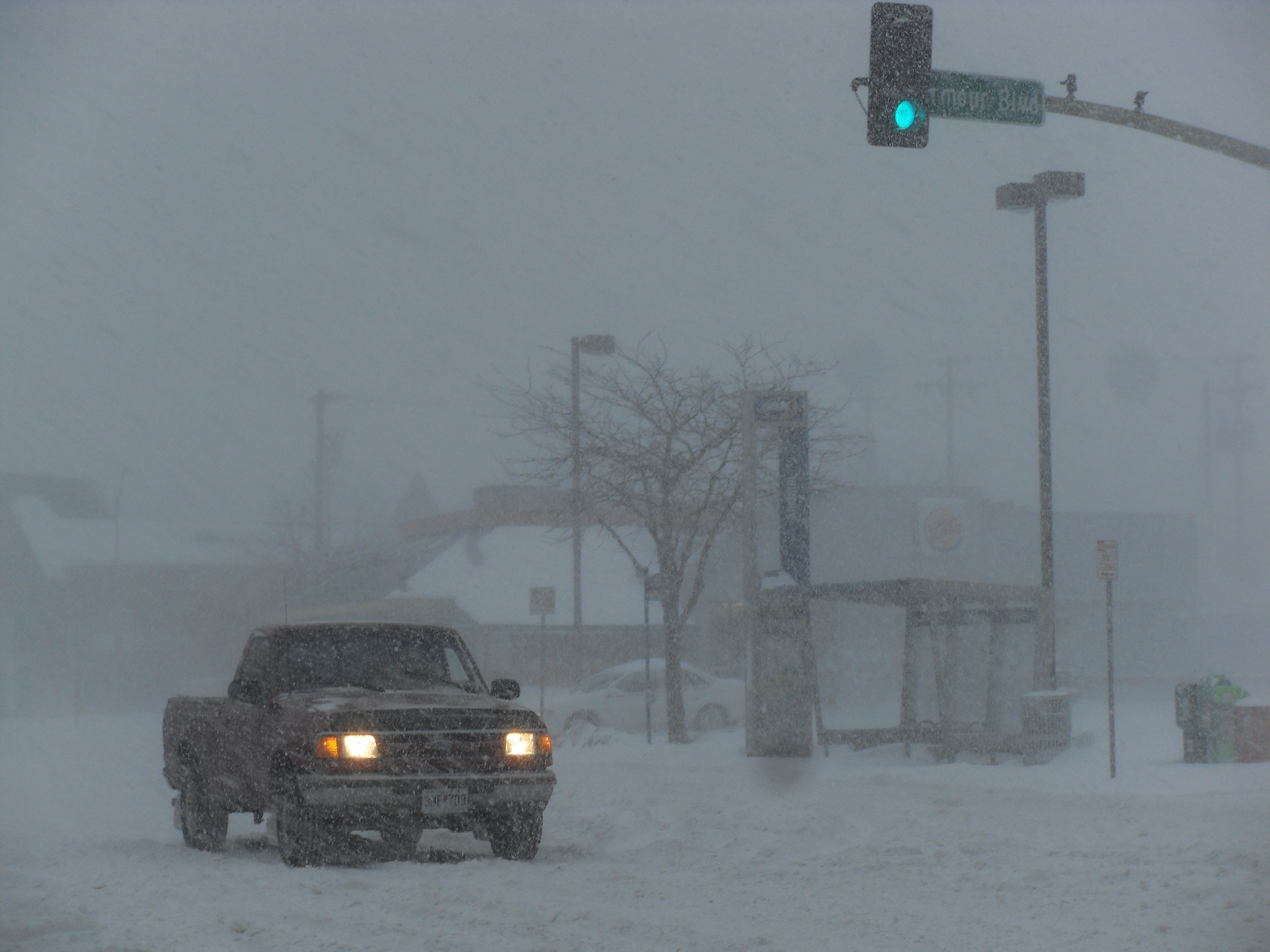
Truck driving through a snowstorm on Main Street in Kansas City, Missouri

== See also ==
- January 25–27, 2011 North American blizzard — the blizzard immediately prior, which also affected the Northeast and Canada
- Chicago Blizzard of 1967
- Chicago Blizzard of 1979
- 1993 Storm of the Century
- North American blizzard of 1999
- February 2007 North America Winter Storm
- 2008 Super Tuesday tornado outbreak
- December 2010 North American blizzard
- January 2016 United States blizzard
- January 31 – February 2, 2015 North American blizzard
- February 2016 North American winter storm
- January 31 – February 3, 2021 nor'easter
