= 1967 Chicago blizzard =

Snowstorm in the Midwest United States

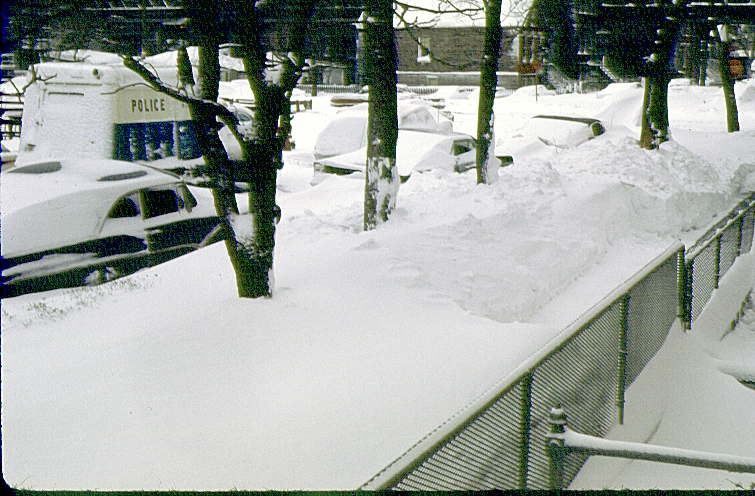
- Sidewalks filled with snow

Meteorological history
- Formed: January 26, 1967
- Dissipated: January 27, 1967

Category 5 "Extreme" blizzard
- Regional snowfall index: 18.13 (NOAA)
- Highest winds: 53 miles per hour (85.3 km/h; 46.1 kn)
- Lowest pressure: 997 mb (hPa)
- Max. snowfall: 23 inches (58 cm)

Overall effects
- Casualties: 86 total deaths (26 deaths in Chicago, 60 in region)
- Damage: $150 million (1967 dollars); all transportation stopped
- Areas affected: Northeastern Illinois, Northwestern Indiana

The Chicago blizzard of 1967 struck northeast Illinois and northwest Indiana on January 26–27, 1967, with a record-setting 23 inches (58 cm) snow fall in Chicago and its suburbs before the storm abated the next morning. As of 2026, it remains the greatest snowfall in one storm in Chicago history. As the blizzard was a surprise during the day with people already at work or school, it stopped the city for a few days as people dug out. "The storm was a full-blown blizzard, with 50 mph-plus northeast wind gusts creating drifts as high as 15 feet."

== Chronology ==
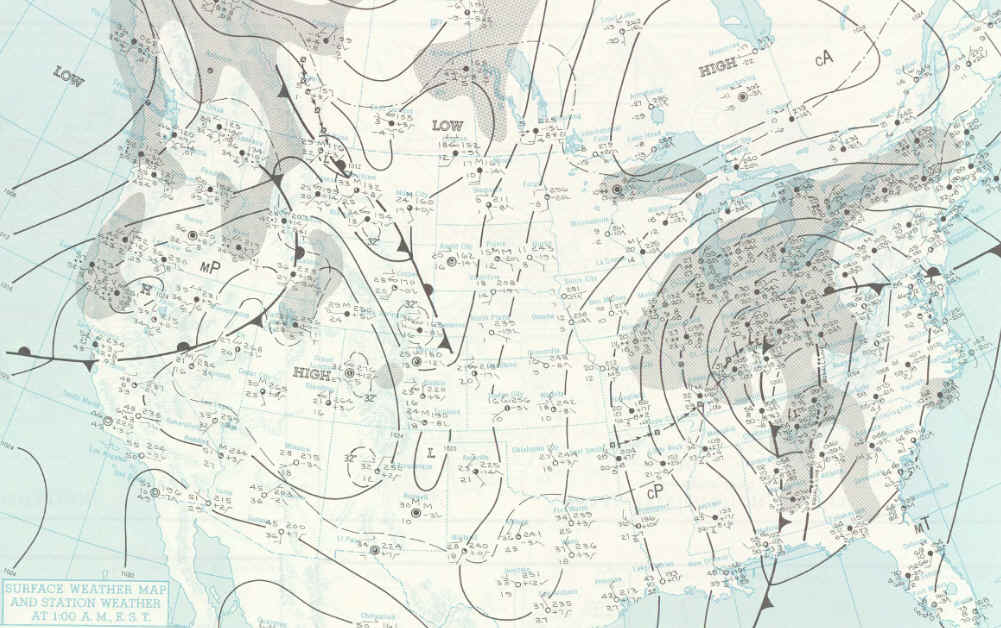
Weather map at midnight on January 27, 1967.

On Tuesday January 24, the maximum temperature was 65 °F (18 °C) but began to fall the next day with the passage of a marked cold front. In fact, the front brought arctic air from a strong 1032 mb high pressure center over the southern Canadian Prairies. By the morning of January 25, the mercury had dropped to 31 degrees F.

On the other hand, an upper-level baroclinic trough, coming from the Rockies, developed a low pressure system at the surface near the Texas Panhandle. At midnight Thursday, January 26, the low moved to Oklahoma while strengthening. During the day, the elevated trough and surface low crossed the Mississippi Valley, reaching South-central Indiana before midnight on January 27 and deepening to 997 mb.

Dew points of 50 to 60 °F (10 to 16 °C), or more, in the warm sector of the surface low brought significant humidity from the Gulf of Mexico while the high pressure moved to the Lake Superior, keeping cold and dry air over the Great Lakes. The strong pressure gradient between the latter and the low pressure center caused strong winds over Lake Michigan, causing widespread blowing snow while heavy snowfall affected the Chicago area.

On January 27, the low occluded. Its central pressure reached 990 mb while passing over Lake Erie and Southern Ontario, Canada. Snow stopped in the evening in Chicago and strong winds moved north-northwest out of the region.

== Forecast ==
The weather forecast on January 25 for the 26th was for rain or snow because the cold front was forecast to stall in the Chicago area. On the evening broadcast, the National Weather Service started talking about snow mixed with freezing rain, but it was not until the night that the forecast was changed to mention snowfall, giving an accumulation of 4 inches. A heavy snow warning was therefore issued. On the morning of January 26, the quantities were increased by 4 to 8 inches, well below what would be received.

People were not aware of the extent of the storm and that the snow would stop travel within and from the area, as noted in the understated opening to the evening news on television station WMAQ-TV on January 26, 1967, where the newsman reported that the worst of the storm was over, which was incorrect.

== Depth of snow and effects on transportation ==
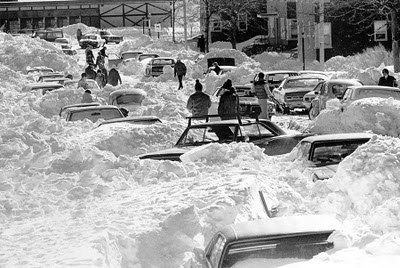
People stranded with their cars in Chicago Blizzard of 1967

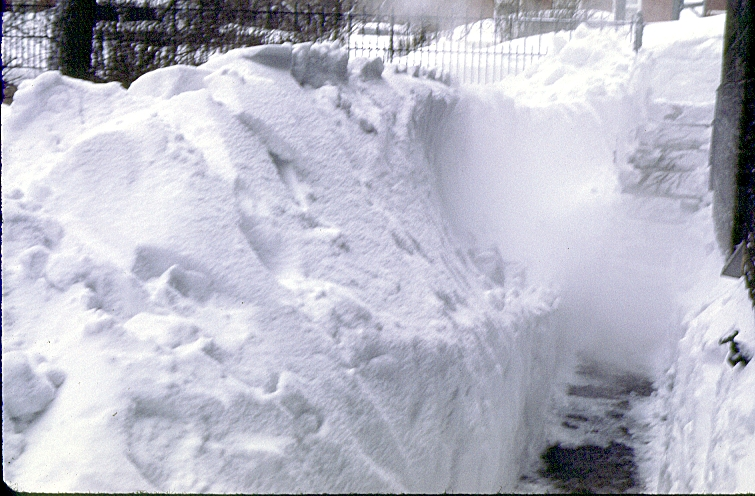
Snowbank of blizzard

The snow fell continuously in Chicago and surrounding areas from 5:02 am on Thursday, January 26 until 10:10 am Friday when 23 inches (58 cm) had fallen. The storm played havoc with travel home from work and school. "Thousands were stranded in offices, in schools, in buses. About 50,000 abandoned cars and 800 Chicago Transit Authority buses littered the streets and expressways." Other sources estimate 20,000 cars and 1,100 buses stranded in the blizzard. Gusts of 48 to 53 miles per hour (measured at Midway Airport) caused large snowdrifts to accumulate. Thunderstorms occurred and several funnel clouds were sighted during the blizzard.

The blizzard closed both Midway Airport and O'Hare Airport. Ten-foot drifts covered the runways at Midway. Chicago Mayor Richard J. Daley ordered city workers to clear city streets around the clock and asked citizens for help. On Friday, the city was virtually shut down and area schools were closed.

Chicago's fleet of 500 snow plows and 2,500 workers was out in force, and additional snow removal equipment was sent from Iowa, Wisconsin and Michigan.

Many of the south suburbs of Chicago reported that their snow plowing equipment failed during the blizzard, and recommended people stay home on Friday, as recorded in a collection of local radio news reports from the first day of the blizzard.

Although the city was on the move again by Tuesday, it took the city of Chicago three weeks to plow all the streets of snow, as it did not warm up enough for the snow to melt away.

In 2017 as the 50th anniversary of the blizzard neared, people looked back on their own stories of the first day, how long it took some to get home, up to six hours for a usual half hour trip, and how some did not get home for one to two days, staying in their car, in a local tavern. One woman decided to walk home from her downtown job, and she said, "People were helping each other — it was wonderful. People were stopping in cars that could get through, and they would take you a certain distance," she said. "Back then, you could trust people to take you where you wanted to go. You never thought twice about getting in and letting them give you a ride home."

Some sources consider this blizzard to have been "paralyzing" to the city, and the greatest disruption in the city since the Chicago Fire of 1871. Plowing was rendered ineffective as the snow fell because the blizzard winds blew the snow back on the freshly plowed roads, stranding vehicles on expressways and arterial streets alike.

The storm affected the metropolitan Chicago area, with the heaviest snow falling from the west side extending east to northwest Indiana, as far as LaPorte. Rockford, northwest of Chicago, had a few inches of snow, while far southeastern Wisconsin (Lake Geneva down to Kenosha) registered 6-10 inches of snow.

== After the blizzard stopped ==
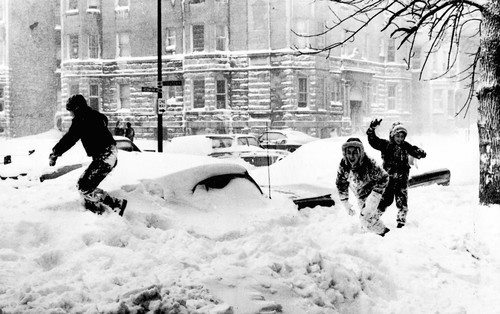
Children playing in the snow after the 1967 blizzard

After the winds stopped blowing, snow removal could be effective, slowly. Helicopters were the emergency vehicles, delivering medicine to diabetics, and food to people stranded in their cars. Expectant mothers were taken to hospitals by sleds, snow plow or even a bulldozer. Women who could not get out delivered their babies at home. The airports opened about midnight Monday after the snow stopped falling. Most schools reopened on Tuesday following the blizzard. People who were school age in the blizzard recall the beauty of the snow-covered city and the fun they had in the snow when school was closed.

== Deaths ==
Twenty-six people died in Chicago due to the blizzard, including a young girl shot in crossfire between looters and police. Some died from heart attacks due to shoveling the snow.

== More snowfall on February 1, 1967 ==
The Chicago area started to recover from the extreme snowfall over the weekend, then it snowed 4 inches (10.2 cm) on Wednesday, February 1. The following Sunday, February 5, another storm dumped 8.5 inches (21.6 cm) of snow.

== Record snowfall for a single storm ==
The 23 inches (58.4 cm) inches of snow that fell on Chicago for 29 hours from the morning of January 26, 1967 is a record for a single storm. The 19.8 inches (50.3 cm) that fell on January 26–27 was the greatest amount of snow for a 24-hour period, later surpassed by Groundhog Day Blizzard of 2011 with 20.0 inches (50.8 cm) February 1–2, 2011. The single day record of 16.4 inches (41.7 cm) for January 26 was later broken by the Chicago Blizzard of 1979 when 16.5 inches (41.9 cm) fell.

Between January 26 and February 5, 36.5 inches (92.7 cm) of snow fell, which is typical for an entire Chicago winter. This helped contribute to the 1966-67 winter setting a record seasonal snowfall of 68.4 inches (173.7 cm) for Chicago, breaking the previous record of 66.4 inches (168.7 cm), set in 1951–52. This record would be surpassed just three seasons later, when the 1969-70 winter dropped 77.0 inches (195.6 cm) of snow on the city. Since 1970, the city has surpassed the 1966-67 snowfall total three additional times: 82.3 inches (209.0 cm) in 1977–78, 89.7 inches (227.8 cm) in 1978–79, and 82.0 inches (208.3 cm) in 2013–14.

In 2011, when another snowstorm was in progress, the ten worst snowstorms in Chicago to that date were noted, the list topped by the January 1967 storm. Later snowstorms did not halt city activity to the same extent, in part because improved weather forecasting allowed businesses to close early when heavy snow was expected. The city also implemented more structured snow-removal plans, including winter restrictions on overnight parking on main streets. Sensors and cameras are in place to see where snow removal is most needed, and the fleet of snow plows is smaller to do the same work, at 330.

== Disposal of the snow ==
Disposing of the snow collected by plows posed challenges on account of the drifting and the quantity of snow and so many roads blocked by abandoned vehicles. Some was put on a train in refrigerated cars to Florida so children there could see what snow looked like. Other railroads disposed of snow on their own property by melting it, or if they had freight trains heading south, loaded a few cars with snow that would melt en route. The city of Chicago resorted to dumping it in the Chicago River, a practice no longer used, for bad effects on river water quality; instead it has designated locations throughout the city for dumping excess accumulations. The city also had a few vehicles that melted the snow in the truck, greatly reducing its volume.

== Photos of the city in the blizzard ==
Several roofs collapsed and vehicles were immobilized by snow, while some residents used snowshoes to travel on January 27, 1967. In 2013, the Chicago Tribune compiled photographs from the period to document the event.
