= North American blizzard of 1999 =

Snowstorm in the United States and Canada

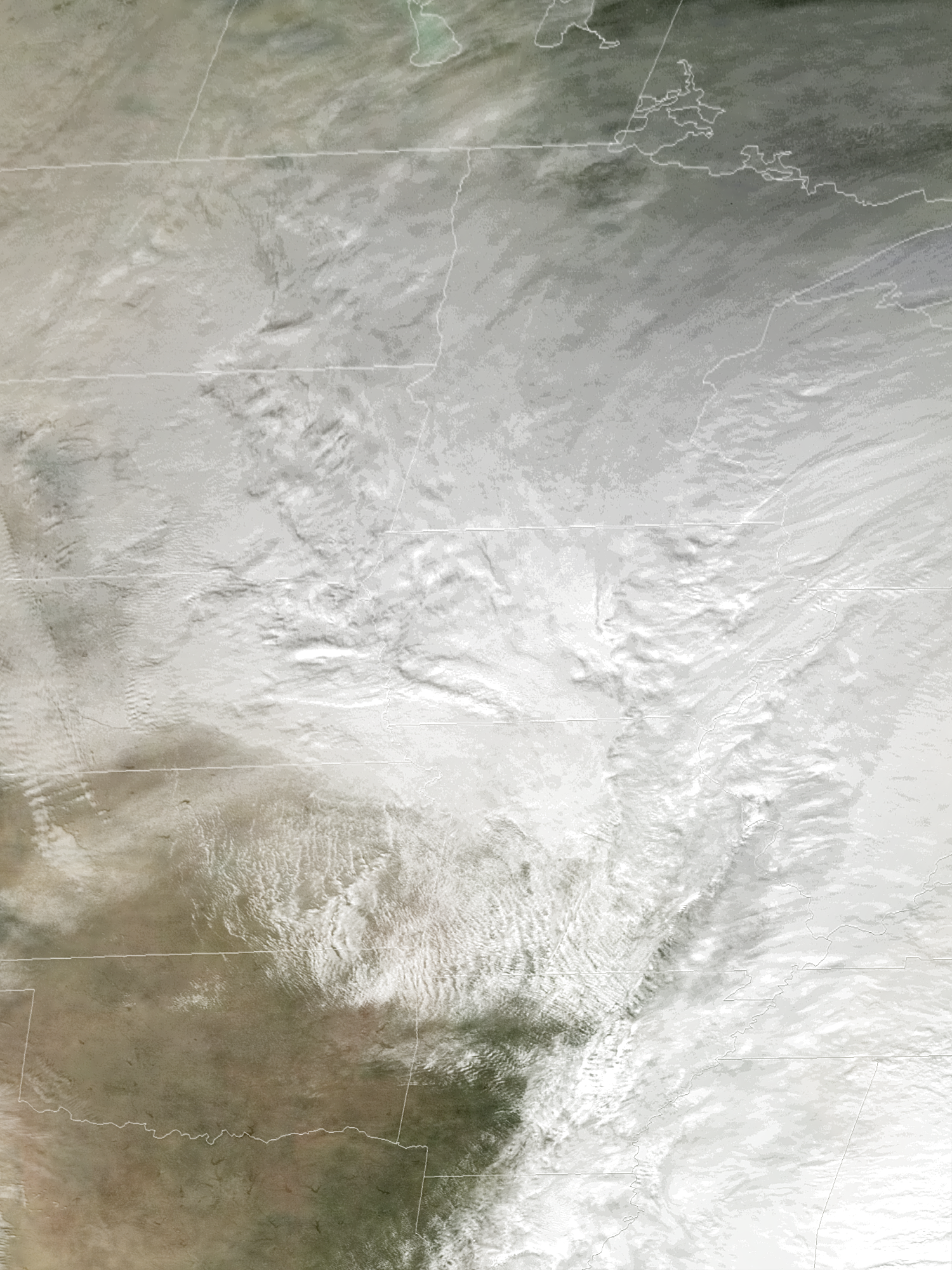
- The winter storm responsible for the blizzard on January 2

Meteorological history
- Formed: January 2, 1999
- Dissipated: January 4, 1999

Category 4 "Crippling" blizzard
- Regional snowfall index: 15.30 (NOAA)
- Max. snowfall: 28.0 inches (71 cm) South Haven, Michigan

Overall effects
- Fatalities: 78
- Economic losses: $300 million (1999 USD)
- Areas affected: Midwestern United States, Central Canada

The Blizzard of 1999 was a strong winter snowstorm which struck the Midwestern United States and portions of central and eastern Canada, hitting hardest in Iowa, Wisconsin, Illinois, Indiana, Michigan, Ohio, southern Ontario, and southern Quebec dumping as much as 60 centimetres (2 ft) of snow in many areas. Chicago received a recorded 21.6 in (55 cm). The storm hit just after New Year's Day, between January 2 and January 4, 1999. Travel was severely disrupted throughout the areas and the cities of Chicago and Toronto were also paralyzed. Additionally, record low temperatures were measured in many towns in the days immediately after the storm (January 4 – January 8).

== The storm ==
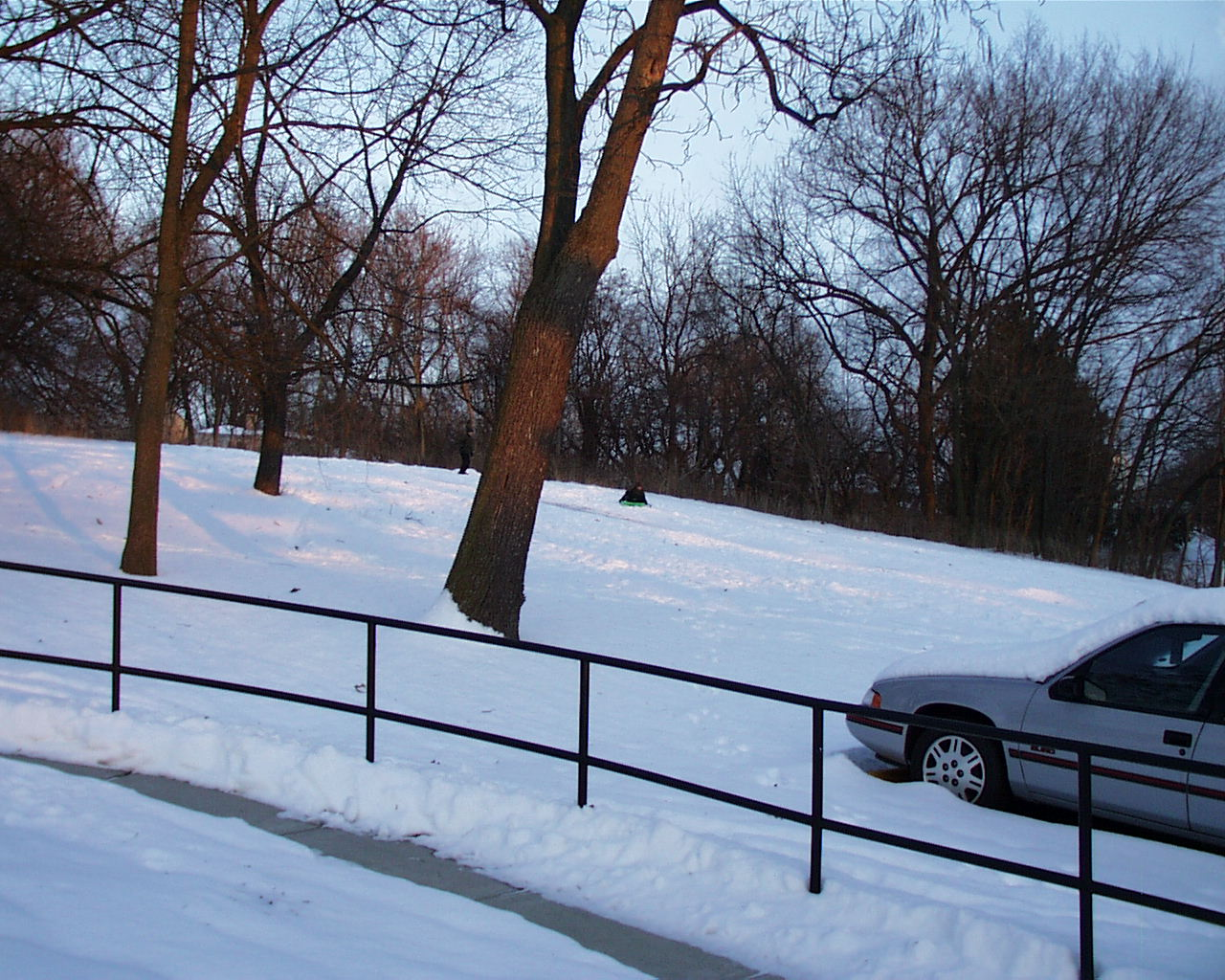
Snow in Upper Arlington, Ohio

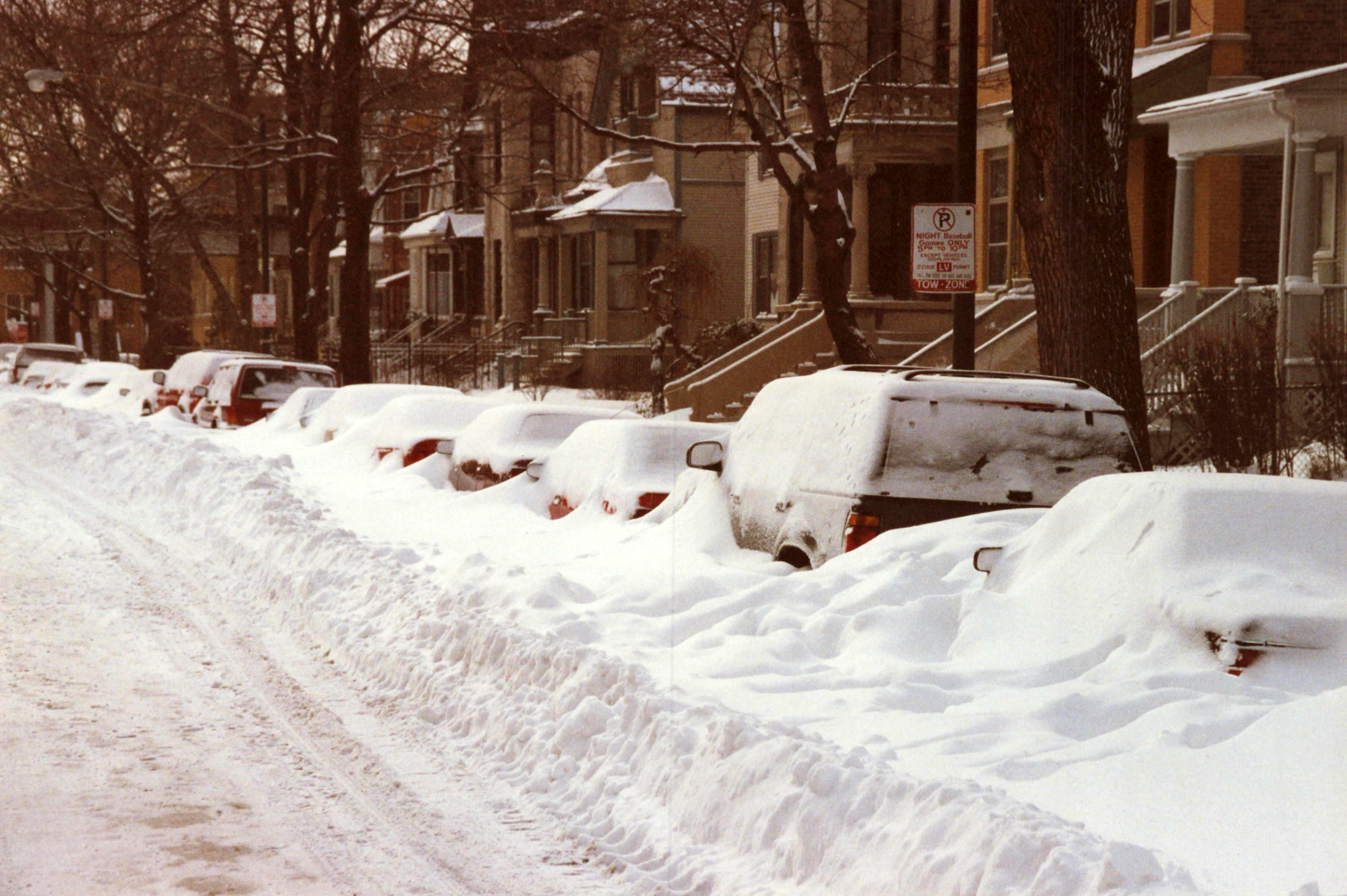
Snow in Chicago

The storm produced 22 inches (55 cm) of snow in Chicago and was rated by the National Weather Service as the second worst blizzard to hit Chicago in the 20th century, after the Blizzard of 1967. Soon after the snow ended, record low temperatures occurred with values of −20 °F (−29 °C) or lower in parts of Illinois and surrounding states on January 3 and 4, including a handful of daily minimum temperatures around −50 °F (−46 °C) on January 4 in the area of heaviest accumulation.

The areas with the heaviest snows, 15 inches (38 cm) or more, included central and northern Illinois, southern Wisconsin, central and northern Indiana, southern Michigan, northern Ohio, and southeast Canada. The storm also traveled across southern Ontario dumping about 12 inches (30 cm) of snow throughout the entire Quebec City-Windsor Corridor.

South of the snow line, the storm produced a significant ice storm across western New York, near the Rochester region and the Genesee Valley where numerous power failures were reported.

== Snowfall totals ==
Lake effect winds off Lake Michigan, unusual for the Chicago shoreline, resulted in enhanced snowfall for communities within about 10 miles (16 km) of the lake. Chicago and its northern suburbs received between 18 and 22 inches (46 and 56 cm) of snow. Chicago broke a one-day snowfall record with 18.6 inches (47 cm) falling on January 2. The total snowfall figures are below:

- South Haven, MI: 28.0 in (71 cm)
- Chicago/O'Hare, IL: 21.6 in (55 cm)
- Chicago/Midway, IL: 20.6 in (52 cm)
- Slinger, WI: 20.5 in (52 cm)
- Galesburg, IL: 20.0 in (51 cm)
- Barrington, IL: 18.0 in (46 cm)
- Lake Villa, IL: 17.9 in (45 cm)
- Chatsworth, IL: 17.0 in (43 cm)
- Dixon, IL: 16.4 in (42 cm)
- Mount Clemens, MI: 16.0 in (41 cm)
- Toronto, ON: 16.0 in (41 cm)
- Portage, IN: 16.0 in (41 cm)
- Glenwood, IL: 16.0 in (41 cm)
- Olympia Fields, IL: 15.8 in (40 cm)
- Brookfield, IL: 15.1 in (38 cm)
- LaGrange Park, IL: 15.0 in (38 cm)
- Remington, IN: 15.0 in (38 cm)
- Aurora, IL: 14.4 in (37 cm)
- Crestwood, IL: 14.2 in (36 cm)
- Bloomington/Normal, IL: 14.0 in (36 cm)
- Algonquin, IL: 14.0 in (36 cm)
- Bourbonnais, IL: 14.0 in (36 cm)
- Streamwood, IL: 14.0 in (36 cm)
- Lafayette, IN: 14.0 in (36 cm)
- Orland Park, IL: 13.8 in (35 cm)
- Rochester, MI: 13.1 in (33 cm)
- Channahon, IL: 13.0 in (33 cm)
- Coal City, IL: 13.0 in (33 cm)
- Fairbury, IL: 13.0 in (33 cm)
- Geneva, IL: 13.0 in (33 cm)
- DeKalb, IL: 12.4 in (31 cm)
- Valparaiso, IN: 12.0 in (30 cm)
- Willow Springs, IL: 12.0 in (30 cm)
- Detroit, MI: 11.3 in (29 cm)
- Earlville, IL: 11.3 in (29 cm)
- Monticello, IN: 11.0 in (28 cm)
- Naperville, IL: 11.0 in (28 cm)
- Ottawa, ON: 10.6 in (27 cm)
- Mundelein, IL: 10.0 in (25 cm)
- Compton, IL: 9.7 in (25 cm)
- Rochelle, IL: 9.6 in (24 cm)
- Harvard, IL: 9.0 in (23 cm)
- Rockford, IL: 9.0 in (23 cm)
- Flint, MI: 8.5 in (22 cm)

== Impact ==
Midwest airports were closed, some for several days. Thousands of flights were canceled. Detroit Metro (DTW) was one of the most severely impacted airports. Thousands of passengers traveling on Northwest Airlines (NWA) were stranded for hours. In 2001, NWA agreed to pay more than $7 million in compensation to stranded passengers. Some passengers spent more than eight and a half hours in their planes after arriving at DTW.

In southern Ontario, Toronto Pearson International Airport was shut down, while numerous flights from Ottawa International Airport were canceled. A series of additional snowstorms over the next 10 days gave Toronto a total of 46 inches (118 cm), a record monthly total for the month of January, prompting then-mayor Mel Lastman to infamously call in the Canadian Army to assist the snow removal with the city at a near standstill. As a result, the mayor and city, through the media endured ridicule from other parts of Canada more prone to such high snowfall amounts. The series of storms that hit Toronto were severe enough to be the winter Storm of the Century despite the fact they were more than one storm.

Rail service was halted or delayed, and highways were impassable. Lake Shore Drive in Chicago was closed for the first time ever. 300 of the Chicago Transit Authority’s 2600-series cars went out of service. Stranded travelers were accommodated in emergency shelters. The bitterly cold temperatures created large ice floes on the inland waterways, causing shipping delays.

Schools were closed for several days, and many businesses were closed as well. Of those that were able to remain open, stores selling snow removal equipment were doing a booming business.

There was also a nationwide blood shortage since a high proportion of blood donations come from the Midwest and many could not make it to the hospital and donate during the storm or during the subsequent cold snap.

In much of Northwest Indiana, blackouts occurred for days at a time. Porter County was without electricity for about 3 days total. Local buildings, such as schools, offered generator-powered heat in their auditoriums.

== The costs ==
Human cost: 78 people perished in the storm. The breakdown of deaths is as follows:

- 39 auto-related deaths
- 5 snowmobile-related deaths
- 32 deaths from over-exertion and heart attacks primarily due to shoveling snow
- 2 froze to death

Financial cost: Losses as a result of the storm are estimated between $300 and $400 million.

Federal aid: 45 counties in Illinois and some areas of Indiana were declared federal disaster areas by President Bill Clinton and eligible to receive federal aid.

== See also ==
- List of Regional Snowfall Index Category 4 winter storms
