= Regional snowfall index =

United States scale that ranks winter storms by severity

Regional Snowfall Index
Category	RSI value	Description
Five	18.0+	Extreme
Four	10–18	Crippling
Three	6–10	Major
Two	3–6	Significant
One	1–3	Notable
Zero	<1.0	Nuisance

The regional snowfall index (RSI) is a scale used by NOAA to assess the societal impact of winter storms in the eastern two-thirds of the United States and classify them into one of six categories. The system was first implemented in 2014, and is a replacement for the Northeast Snowfall Impact Scale (NESIS) system which the National Climatic Data Center (NCDC) began using in 2005. The NCDC has retroactively assigned RSI values to almost 600 historical storms that have occurred since 1900.

Storms are ranked from Category 0 "Nuisance" to Category 5 "Extreme" on the scale. The impact of the storms is assessed in six different regions of the United States: the Northeast, Northern Rockies and Plains, Ohio Valley, South, Southeast, and Upper Midwest.

The index makes use of population and regional differences to assess the impact of snowfall. For example, areas which receive very little snowfall on average may be more adversely affected than other regions, and so the index will grant storms in those regions higher severity.

== Overview ==
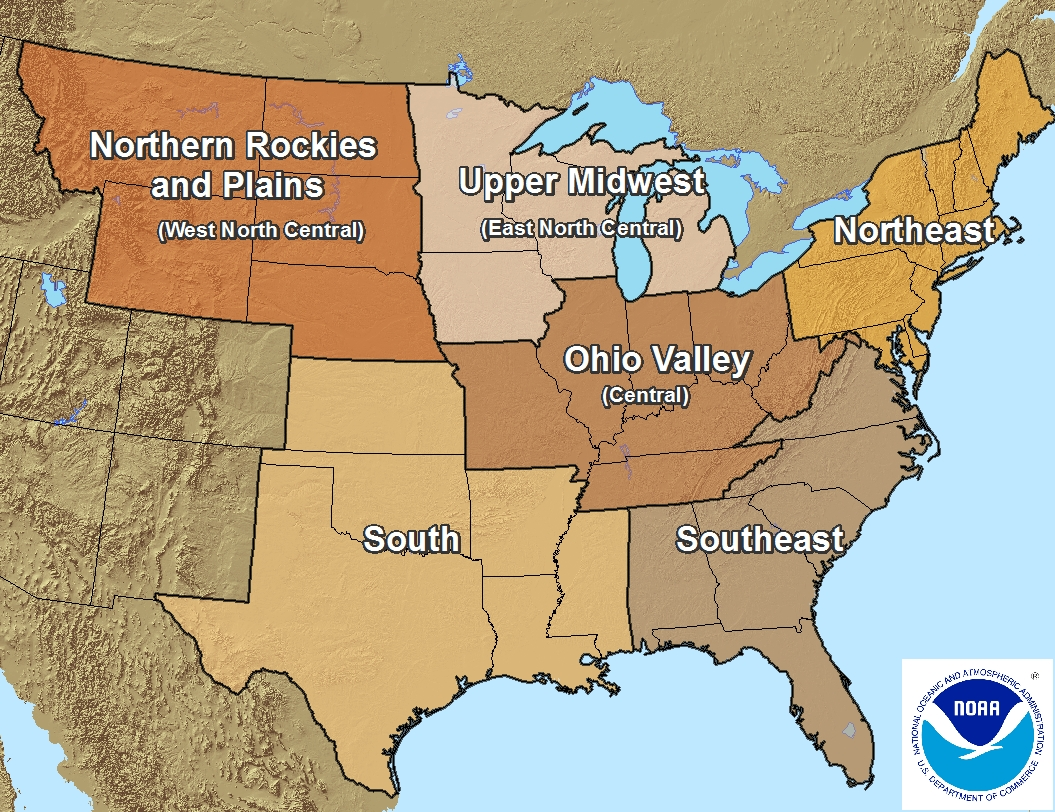
The map shows the six easternmost weather regions of the United States for which the regional snowfall index is calculated.

In each region, four "thresholds" are set based on climatological records for calculation of the RSI value:

- one quarter of the amount of snow typically occurring once every 10 years
- one half of the amount of snow typically occurring once every 25 years
- the amount of snow typically occurring once every 25 years
- one and a half times the amount of snow typically occurring once every 25 years

For example, in the Northeast, a typical location will get 16 inches of snow about once every 10 years and 20 inches about once every 25 years, so the thresholds are 4, 10, 20, and 30 inches.

For each threshold and each region, a baseline area and population are determined; for a given storm, the area that exceeds a particular threshold will be normalized by the baseline value. For example, for a storm in the Northeast, the area receiving at least 4 inches of snow is divided by 149,228 square miles, and the population affected is divided by 51,553,600 (using 2010 census data). This gives eight different numbers representing how widespread the storm is compared to notable snow storms in that region. The baseline area and population represent the average area and population for large storms, so that each of these eight different measures will average to an RSI value of 1.0 among storms considered notable (for the calibration sample). The RSI is simply the sum of these eight numbers.

== See also ==
- List of regional snowfall index category 5 winter storms
- List of regional snowfall index category 4 winter storms
- Miller classification
- Accumulated winter season severity index
