= 2025–26 North American winter =

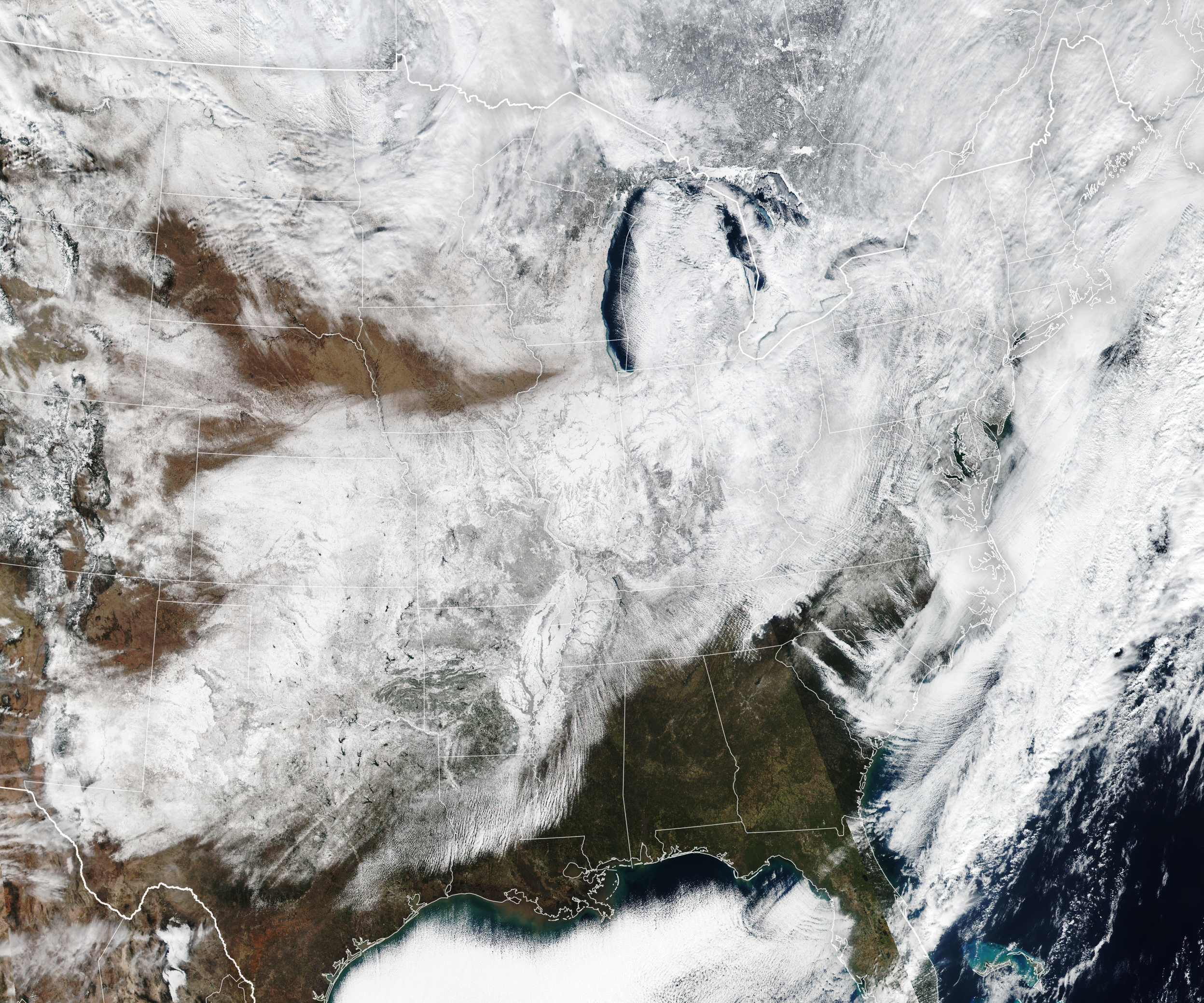
- Expansive snow cover across North America on January 26, following a major winter storm

Seasonal boundaries
- Meteorological winter: December 1 – February 28
- Astronomical winter: December 21 – March 20
- First event started: October 11, 2025
- Last event concluded: May 6, 2026

Most notable event
- Name: January 23–27, 2026 North American winter storm
  - Duration: January 23–27, 2026
  - Lowest pressure: 958 mb (28.29 inHg)
  - Fatalities: 174 fatalities
  - Damage: >$4 billion (2026 USD)

Seasonal statistics
- Total WPC-issued storms: 21 total (Note: Includes two events listed on the prototype Event Reviews page, that being events on November 9 and March 12, and retrospectively includes 2 storms that did not have summaries, but were tracked through WPC surface analyses and Event Review page and were significant enough to still warrant inclusion within this page in the seasonal summary. This includes two events on December 13–14 and January 18–19.)
- Rated storms (RSI) (Cat. 1+): 6 total
- Major storms (RSI) (Cat. 3+): 3 total
- Maximum snowfall accumulation: 115 in (290 cm) near Dodge Ridge, California (February 15–20, 2026)
- Maximum ice accretion: 1 in (25 mm) in multiple locations (January 23–27, 2026)
- Total fatalities: 275 total
- Total damage: > $11.3 billion (2026 USD)

Related articles
- 2025–26 Asian winter; Winter of 2025–26 in Great Britain and Ireland; 2025–26 European windstorm season

The 2025–26 North American winter featured extreme contrasts across North America, being consistently frigid and wintry across the eastern half, particularly in the Northeastern United States – the most impactful since the 2020–21 winter season — while the western half of the continent experienced record warmth and lack of wintry precipitation. The Weather Prediction Center (WPC) tracked a total of 21 significant winter weather events, with 6 winter storms being rated on the Regional Snowfall Index (RSI), and 3 attaining a ranking of "Major" or higher (Category 3+). The winter season began early with a binary low pressure-centered nor'easter and the remnants of Typhoon Halong affecting the U.S. state of Alaska in mid-October. The prevalent pattern during the winter, beginning in December, featured a dip in the jet stream and polar vortex over the eastern half of the country. This continued into January despite a brief warm-up, evolving into a prolonged and extensive cold wave that lasted into mid-February; with the most significant and damaging event of the season occurring at the end of the month with a widespread and devastating Category 3 winter storm that affected almost the entire continent. Significant events continued into February, with the heaviest winter storm in the Carolinas in decades at the start of the month, and a historic and severe Category 3 blizzard that affected the Northeast in the second half of the month. The season concluded with a crippling and historic blizzard that affected the Upper Midwest in mid-March, and was the first Category 5 storm to be rated on the Regional Snowfall Index since the January 2016 United States blizzard. Collectively, the winter weather events this season have killed 275 people – the deadliest since the 2020–21 winter season, and together causing an estimated $11.3 billion in damages.

The persistent pattern during the winter also contributed to other significant events during the season, including those ranked on the RSI, included a pair of two RSI-rated winter storms that disrupted post-US Thanksgiving travel across the continent, and a disruptive winter storm in mid-December that brought some of the largest snowfall accumulations to the Mid-Atlantic/I-95 corridor in several years. Additionally, a large storm complex produced extremely high wind gusts across the western U.S. following the previous storm. Separately, the lack of winter storms tracking through the Rocky Mountains region throughout the winter led to one of the worst snowpack seasons there to date, due to persistent ridging of high pressure, above-average temperatures and unfavorable storm tracks; the city of Salt Lake City, Utah experienced its least snowy winter on record as a result. Like the previous winter, a weak La Niña was expected to influence weather patterns across the North American continent during the season.

While there is no well-agreed-upon date used to indicate the start of winter in the Northern Hemisphere, there are two definitions of winter which may be used. Based on the astronomical definition, winter begins at the winter solstice, which in 2025 occurred on December 21, and ends at the March equinox, which in 2026 occurred on March 20. Based on the meteorological definition, the first day of winter is December 1 and the last day February 28. Both definitions involve a period of approximately three months, with some variability. Winter is often defined by meteorologists to be the three calendar months with the lowest average temperatures. Since both definitions span the calendar year, it is possible to have a winter storm spanning two different years.

== Seasonal forecasts ==
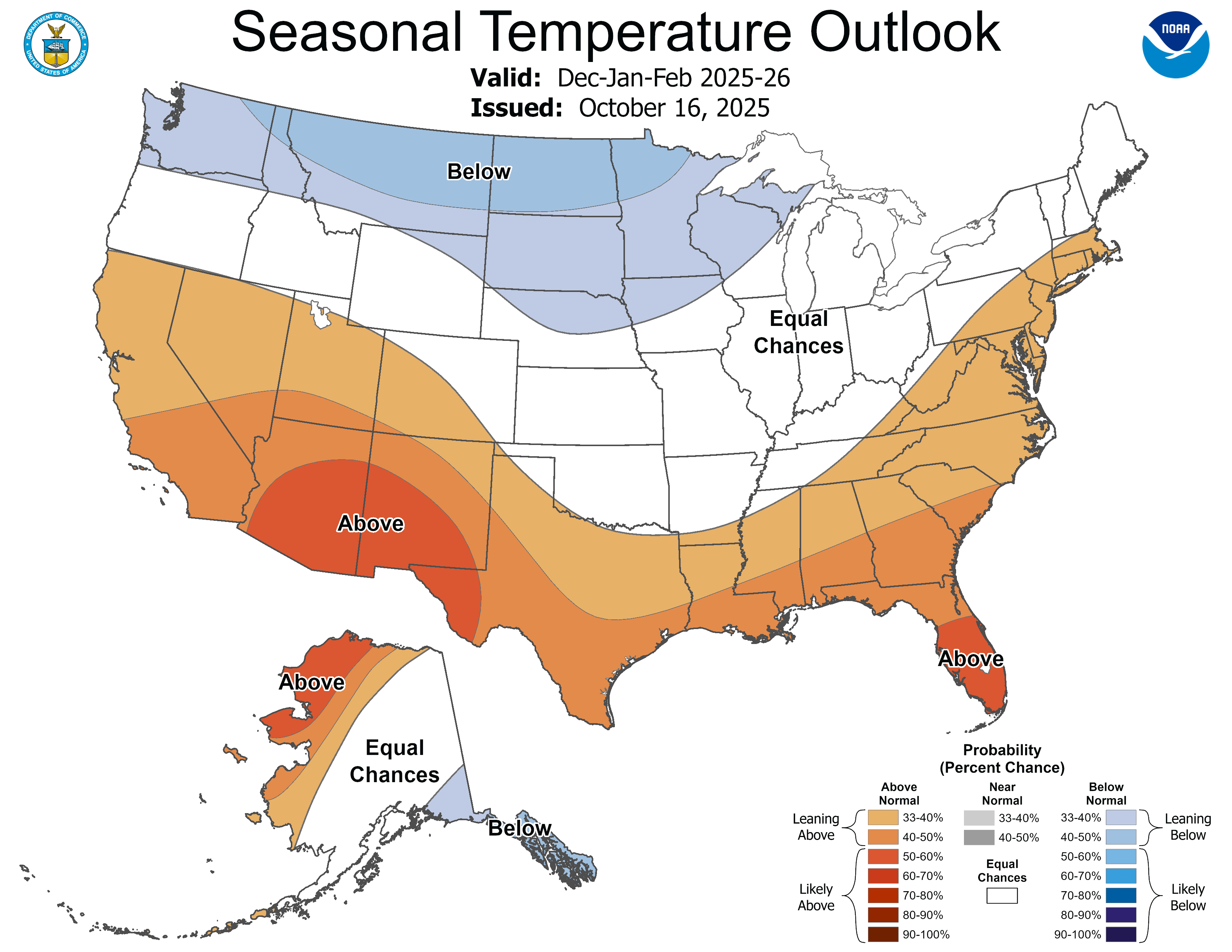
Temperature outlook in the United States

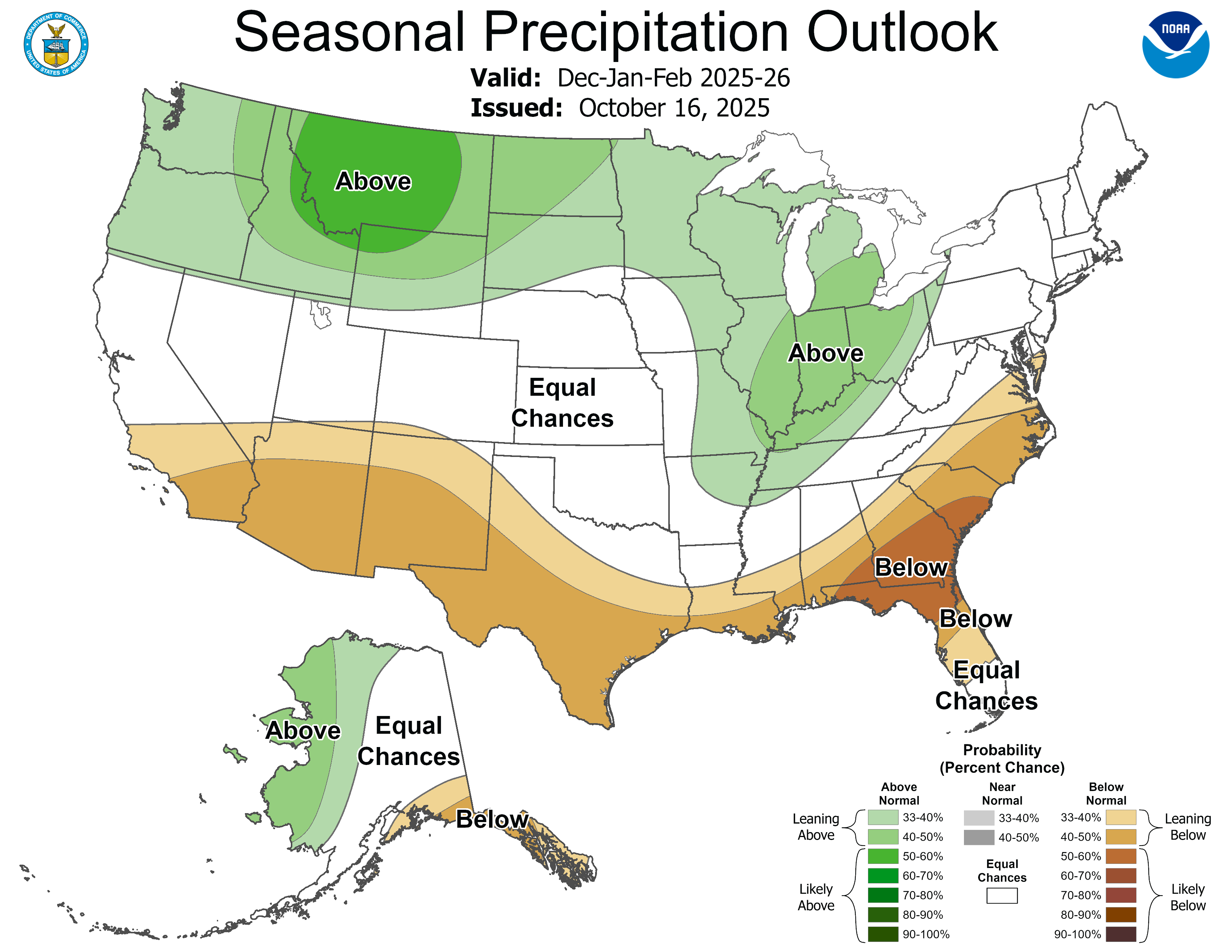
Precipitation outlook in the United States

On October 16, 2025, the National Oceanic and Atmospheric Administration's Climate Prediction Center released its U.S. Winter Outlook. The temperature and precipitation outlooks reflected the likelihood of a weak La Niña pattern that would continue during most of the winter. The forecast called for warmer than average temperatures across much of the southern United States in addition to the East Coast, as well as the Gulf Coast, with colder than average temperatures in the Northwestern United States. The forecast also called for drier than average conditions across the southern United States (which saw no hurricane landfalls during the 2025 Atlantic hurricane season, increasing drought prospects), and wetter than average conditions in the northwest and central United States.

On December 11, 2025, Environment Canada released its winter outlook for December, January and February as part of their monthly climate outlooks. The agency predicted above-average temperatures across regions surrounding the Hudson Bay, including Ontario and Quebec. Nova Scotia was expected to be both near-average and below average in terms of temperature on the eastern and western parts of the region. Areas further out west in the country near the Great Lakes were expected to experience higher precipitation amounts, while eastern Canada was forecasted to have a more "dynamic season".

On September 10, 2025, the National Meteorological Service the National Water Commission of Mexico predicted a slightly below average season of 48 cold fronts impacting the country from September 2025 to May 2026. 19 of those cold fronts were forecasted to impact the Yucatan Peninsula. A 60% chance of a weak, short-lived La Niña was predicted to develop during the fall. Above average temperatures was forecasted for October and November due to the La Niña. The Sierra Madre Occidental region was forecasted to have below-average minimum temperatures.

== Seasonal summary ==
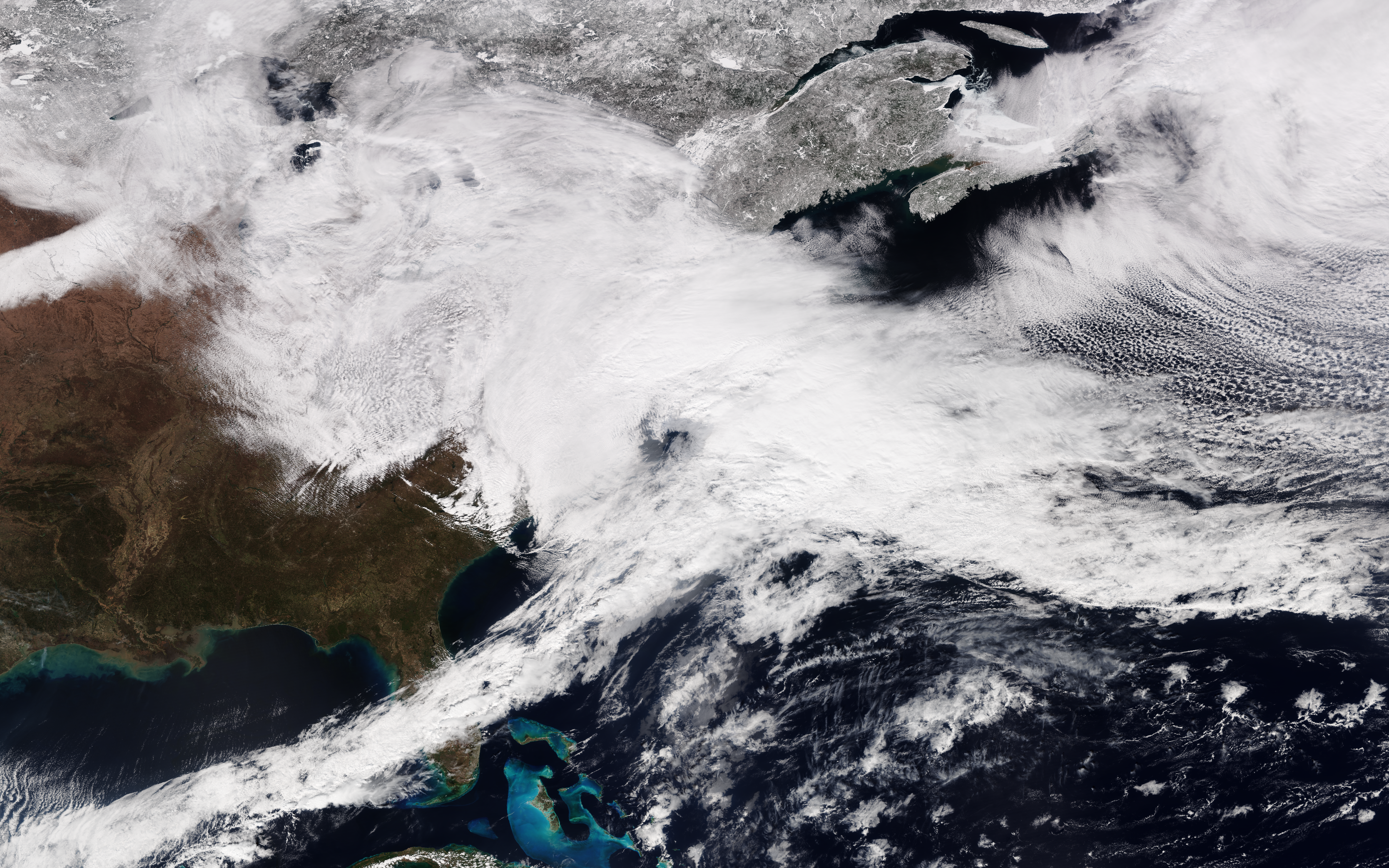
A blizzard developing off the eastern United States on February 22

The winter season of 2025–26 began early, with one of the first storms of the season affecting the Sierra Nevada in mid-October, bringing over 2 ft (0.61 m) of snow to the area; at the same time, a nor'easter developed off the southeast U.S., causing coastal impacts and flooding along with gusty winds. Separately, the remnants of Typhoon Halong were also impacting Alaska by October 14. In early November, an arctic front proceeded to usher in the first snowfall of the season east of the Mississippi River, primarily within the Great Lakes, while also bringing abnormally cold temperatures in its wake. A significant pattern change that would ultimately end up as the dominant weather pattern throughout the winter emerged by the start of US Thanksgiving week, as the Upper Midwest were affected by a significant blizzard, with two more winter storms affecting the same areas days later, the latter of which went on to affect parts of the interior Northeast into early December. December by large featured below average temperatures in the eastern half of the continent, and by mid-month on December 13, a winter storm impacted the eastern United States and Atlantic Canada, bringing the largest snow accumulations to parts of the Interstate 95 corridor not seen in several years. Days later, another system traversed the country brought hurricane-force gusts to the western and central United States, as well as causing power outages across the United States and Canada. The day after Christmas, another winter storm impacted the Great Lakes and Northeastern United States. In New York, 8–12 in (20–30 cm) of snow fell in parts of the state, and New York City saw 4.3 in (11 cm) of snow, the highest total there since January 28–29, 2022. The highest total was 13 in (33 cm) of snow which occurred in Phoenicia, New York. Cities south of Hartford, Connecticut received 5–9 in (13–23 cm) of snow. Large parts of western Pennsylvania saw 0.1–0.25 in (2.5–6.4 mm) of ice. Over 0.5 in (13 mm) of ice was reported in parts of eastern Pennsylvania. Parts of New Jersey and Pennsylvania saw 1 in (2.5 cm) of sleet. Another system brought blizzard conditions to the Midwest and the Great Lakes shortly afterwards.

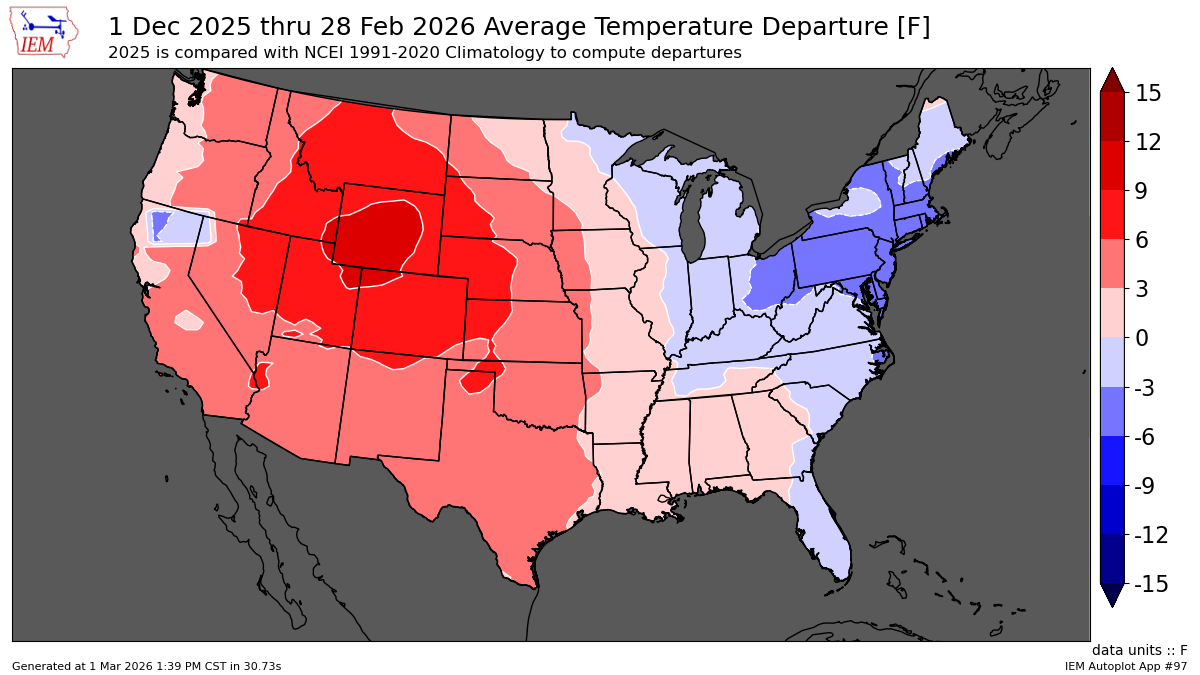
Average temperature anomalies in the United States during the 2025–26 winter.

In mid-January, after a brief moderation in temperatures during the first half of the month, colder weather returned during the second half. A winter storm brought snow for the second time in two consecutive winters in parts of the Florida Panhandle on January 17–18, before affecting the Northeast and New England the following day. Snow also fell at Gillette Stadium during an NFL playoffs game. Much less snow fell in New York City, with only 1 in (2.5 cm) recorded at Central Park, although some suburbs recorded nearly 4 in (10 cm). Later that month in late January, the deadliest winter storm since the 2021 Texas power crisis impacted North America and broke numerous snowfall records, spreading an enormous swath of heavy snow and ice from Texas to Maine and Canada; 173 people were killed as a result. At the same time, the persistent pattern bringing colder temperatures intensified, as a prolonged arctic outbreak had developed, bringing well-below average and record low temperatures across the U.S. and Canada. At the end of January and heading into February, a nor'easter brought the heaviest snowstorm to The Carolinas in nearly 25 years. A fast-moving clipper system along an arctic front produced an unexpectedly heavy snowstorm in the New England region on February 6–7; an inverted trough developed near Cape Cod, Massachusetts and produced heavy snowfall accumulations just to the north of Boston, Massachusetts. While the city itself only saw 4 in (10 cm) of snow, multiple towns to its north saw up to 1 foot (12 in; 30 cm). The highest accumulation was 13 inches (33 cm) in the towns of Salisbury and Hamilton, while surrounding states such as Connecticut, Rhode Island and parts of far eastern Long Island saw more moderate snow accumulations of 4–7 inches (10–18 cm). By the second week of February, the cold wave had broken down, but the wintry weather continued to persist in the eastern half of the U.S., with another system bringing a quick 1–3 inches (2.5–7.6 cm) to the Mid-Atlantic states. Several powerful winter storms then impacted the West Coast from February 15–19, particularly California, dropping feet of snow, and also contributing to an avalanche in Lake Tahoe that killed 9 people. Days later, on February 21–23, a powerful and historic blizzard struck much of the Northeast, bringing 2–3 feet (24–36 in; 61–91 cm) across much of the region and crippling travel, killing 13; multiple snowfall records in New England were also broken. In the following month, a system produced intense winds in the Western and the Midwestern United States as well as in British Columbia in early March. Soon after, a powerful blizzard in the middle of the month broke snowfall records records in Wisconsin and Michigan. Two consecutive storms impacted the northern United States in the first week of April. Finally in May, a storm brought heavy snowfall to parts of the Rockies.

== Events ==
There were several winter weather events during the 2025–26 North American winter. Significant events include cold waves, snowstorms, and other notable events outside the conventional limits of winter.

=== Mid-October nor'easter ===
- Category 0 "Nuisance" (RSI/NOAA: N/A)
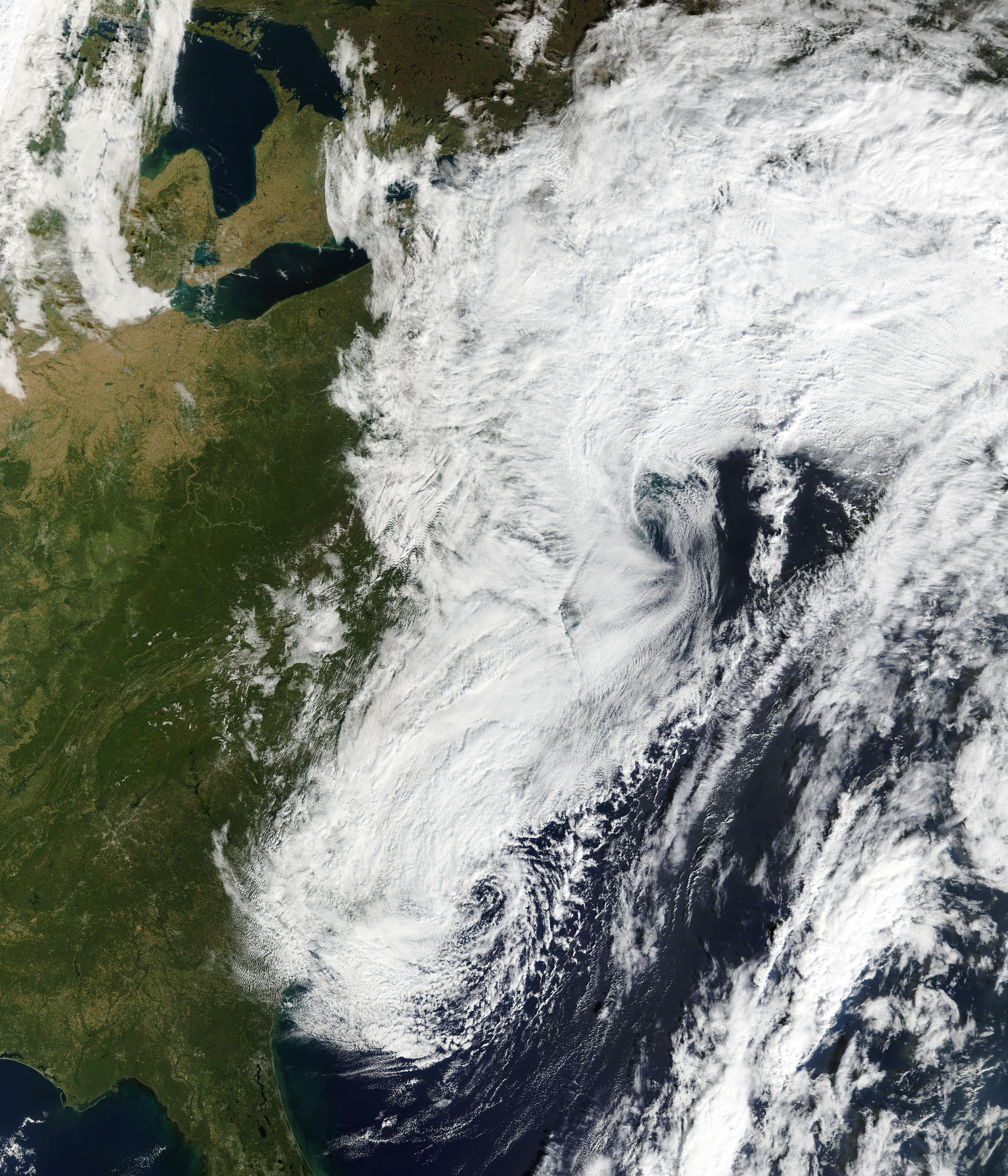
- Duration: October 10 – October 14, 2025
- Lowest pressure: 991 mb (29.26 inHg)
- Fatalities: 1 fatalities
- Damage: $225 million (2025 USD)

A cold front moving over the Northeast stalled over the Florida Peninsula and a low pressure system began developing over Florida at 1500 UTC on October 10. The storm intensified as it tracked up the mid-Atlantic, dropping below 1,000 mbar (30 inHg) by 2100 UTC on October 11. It attained a pressure of 991 mbar (29.3 inHg) at 0900 UTC on October 12. As the original low approached the Carolinas, on at 1800 UTC, a second low formed northeast of it which peaked at 1,001 mbar (29.6 inHg) the next day on October 13 at 0000 UTC, while also absorbing moisture from the remnants of Tropical Storm Jerry which was located to its southeast. Conditions improved in the Mid-Atlantic and southern New England as the two lows weakened, with the northern low dissipating while the southern low moving out into the Western Atlantic by 1500 UTC on October 14.

The National Weather Service announced a Coastal Flood Watch, Storm Watch, and High Wind Warnings across Delaware. River gauges were forecasted to reach major flooding stage. The Delaware National Guard was activated on October 12. A state of emergency was declared and took effect at 10 PM on October 11 in New Jersey. The National Weather Service issued High Wind Warnings as well as Flood Watches. Sandbag filling stations were established in Monmouth County. Major flooding was forecasted for New Jersey. NJ Transit stopped rail service to some parts. In South Carolina, flooding started a few hours before high tide in Charleston, reaching 5–6 in (13–15 cm) by 10 AM on October 10. Charleston Harbor saw 8.46 ft (2.58 m) of flooding on October 10, reaching major flood stage that morning and again on October 11. In addition, Charleston Police closed several roads due to flooding. Flooding occurred 70 mi (110 km) north of Charleston in Georgetown by 9:00 AM on October 12. Some people in cars were rescued due to floodwaters. Gusts of over 50 mph (80 km/h) were reported in North Carolina, with one at 61 mph (98 km/h) at Cape Lookout and another at 58 mph (93 km/h) on Pine Island. 2–4 ft (0.61–1.22 m) of coastal flooding occurred along the Outer Banks and significant flooding occurred on Highway 12 leading to closures on October 12. New Jersey saw flooding on October 12 with Avalon seeing 6–12 ft (1.8–3.7 m) feet high waves that afternoon. Around 9,900 in New Jersey lost power, with 2,033 just in Monmouth County on October 13. High winds in New York City caused a solar panel to strike a woman on October 13, killing her. Downed trees were reported. 3,900 lost power on Long Island. The high winds from the storm knocked down trees leading to some road closures in Connecticut. The downed trees and high winds led to almost 11,500 without power. A gust of 65 mph (105 km/h) was recorded in Cape Cod. Damages totaled to $225 million in damages according to Gallagher Re.

=== Ex-Typhoon Halong ===
- Category 0 "Nuisance" (RSI/NOAA: N/A)
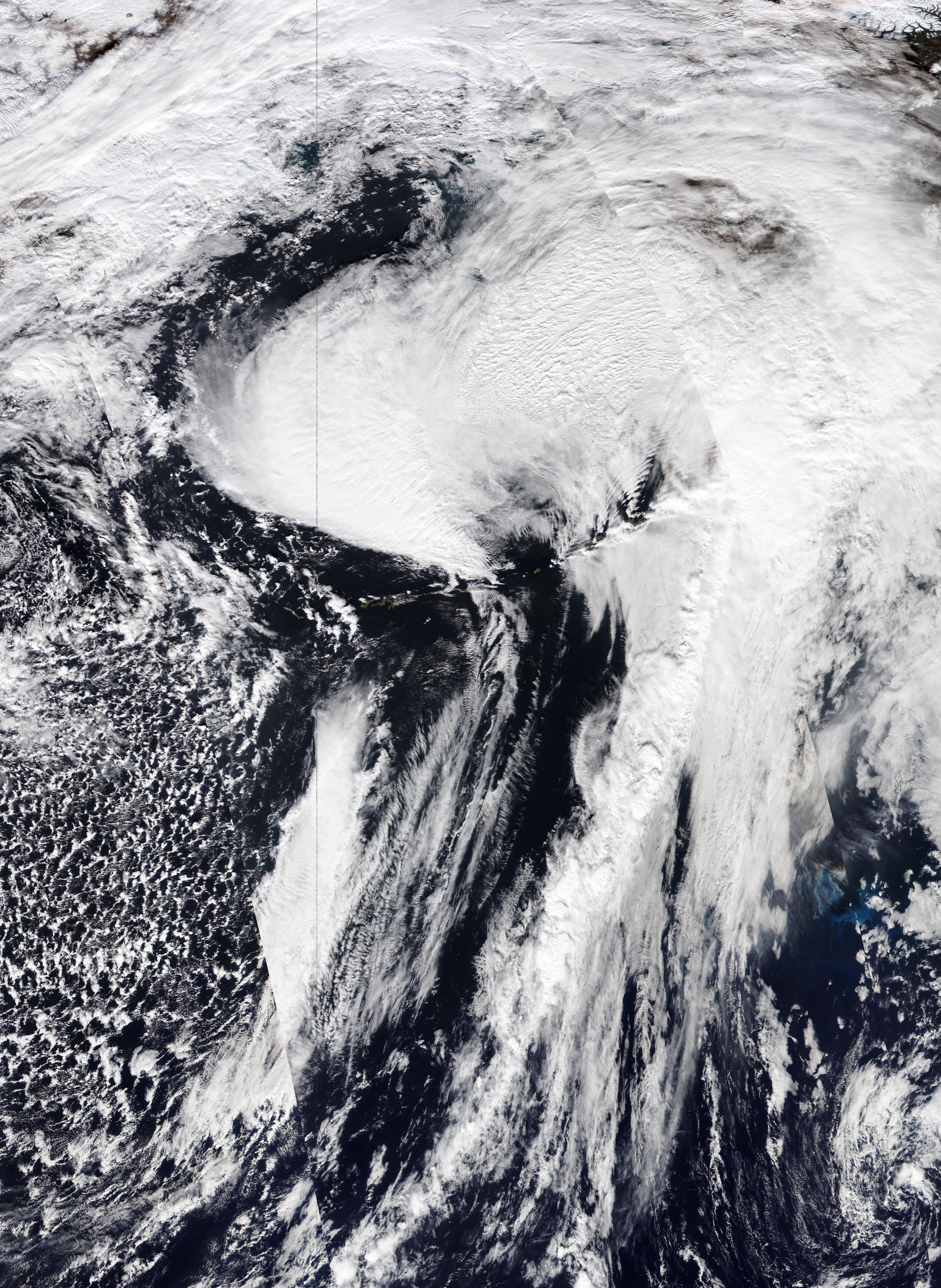
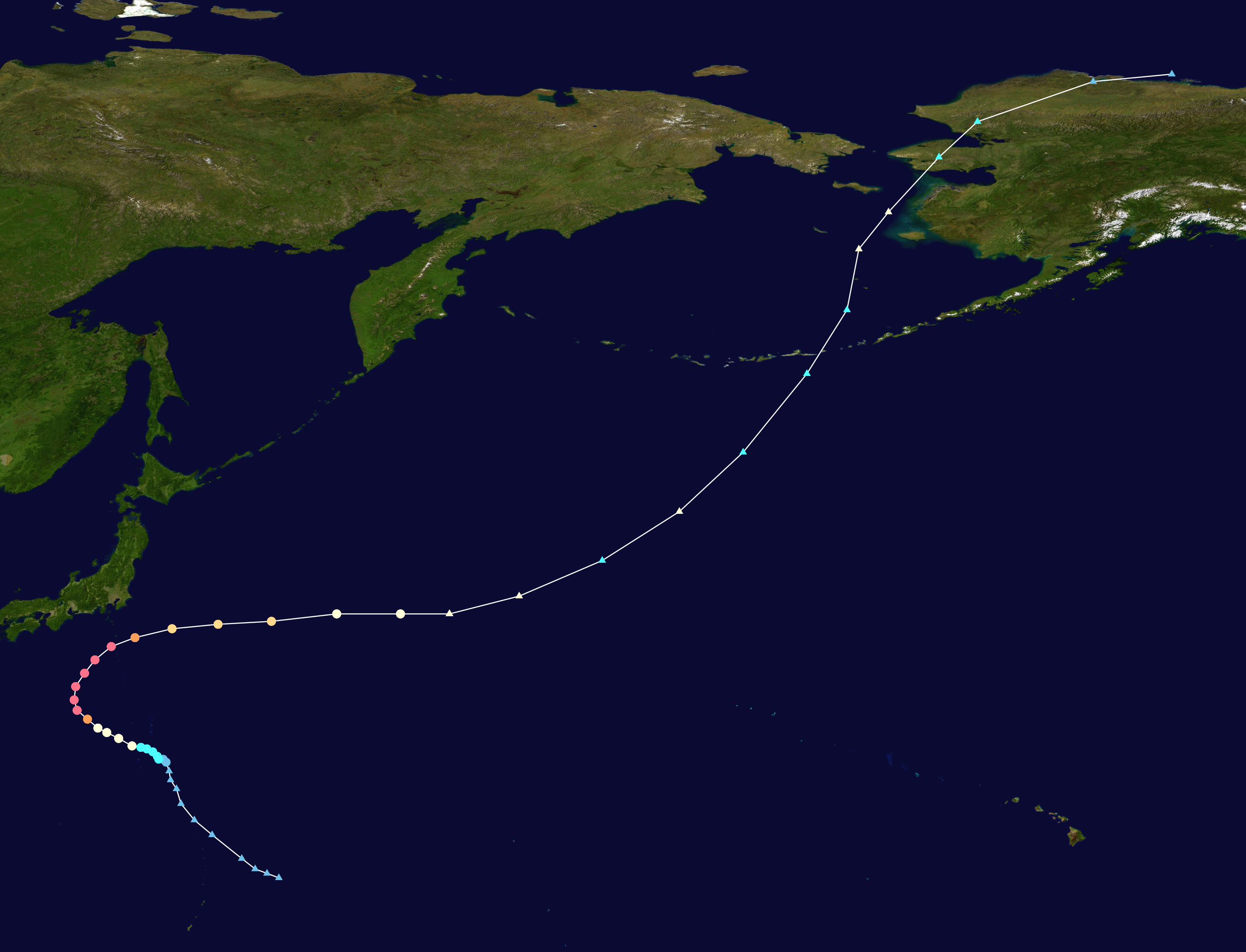
- Duration: October 12 – October 13, 2025
- Lowest pressure: 962 mb (28.41 inHg)
- Fatalities: 1 fatalities
- Damage: $125 million (2025 USD)

The remnants of former Typhoon Halong moved northward near and affected the Aleutian Islands on October 11. The cyclone then moved into the southern Bering Sea that afternoon, and then moved north along the western coast of Alaska on October 12. It made landfall near Buckland later that day. On October 13, Halong entered the Arctic Ocean near Banks Island and began rapidly weakening. The remnants of the storm dissipated later that day.

In Western Alaska, flood and high wind watches were issued as the extratropical remnants of Halong approached, bringing hurricane-force winds to the Bering Sea. The storm caused widespread damage in the Yukon-Kuskokwim Delta, where winds reached 107 miles per hour (172 km/h) in the Kusilvak Mountains. Record flooding hit Kipnuk and Kwigillingok, where homes were swept away and several residents went missing. One fatality was confirmed in Kwigillingok, with two others missing. A FEMA assessment estimated the storm to have caused $125 million in damages.

=== Early November lake-effect snow ===
- Category 0 "Nuisance" (RSI/NOAA: N/A)
- Duration: November 9, 2025 – November 11, 2025
- Maximum snow: 9–12 in (23–30 cm)
- Fatalities: 0 fatalities

A significant early season winter storm dropped heavy lake-effect snowfall near the Great Lakes from November 9–11. Particularly hardest hit included the areas in and around the coastal regions of Wisconsin, Illinois, Indiana and Michigan and surrounding regions. Heavy snowfall totals ranging from 9–12 in (23–30 cm) were reported in the most affected cities where snowfall rates ranged up to 2–3 inches (5.1–7.6 cm) an hour. Wind gusts up to 58 mph (93 km/h) also accompanied the winter storm closest to the lake near Chicago. Farther east, many other areas in the Northeast, including portions the states of Pennsylvania, New York and parts of New Jersey saw light snowfall accumulation on November 11, marking the first of the season for many. The passage of the associated arctic front with the system throughout the eastern half of the United States on November 10 and 11 led to near-record-breaking cold temperatures for the month of November, affecting up to 200 million people. Freeze warnings and cold weather advisories were issued far south into the Southeast, including Florida. Wind chills as low as −12 °C (10 °F) were reported in the coldest regions.

=== US Thanksgiving Week blizzard ===
- Category 0 "Nuisance" (RSI/NOAA: N/A)
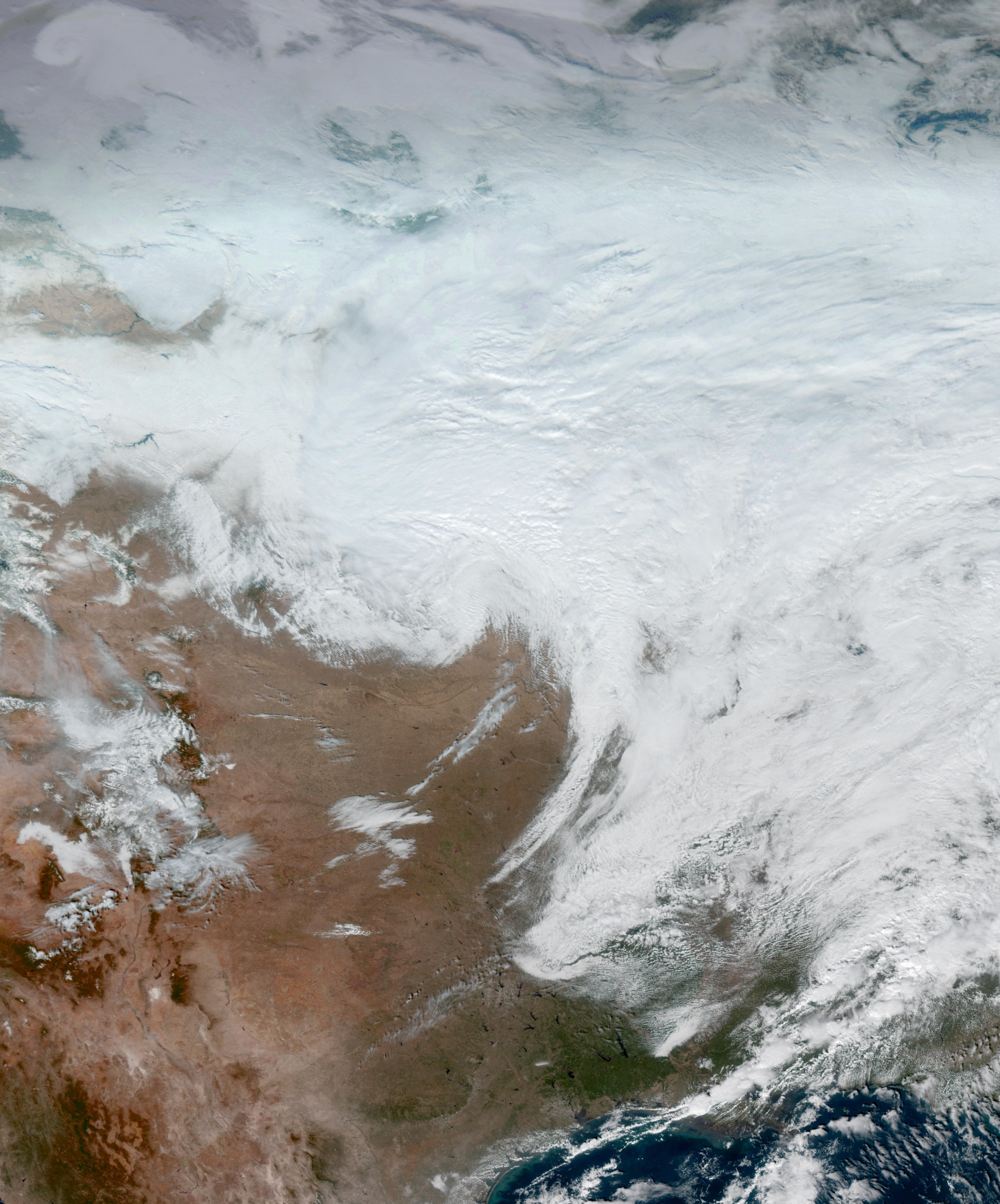
- Duration: November 24 – November 27, 2025
- Lowest pressure: 991 mb (29.26 inHg)
- Maximum snow: 33 in (84 cm)
- Fatalities: 2 fatalities
- Damage: > $250 million (2025 USD)

As US Thanksgiving week unfolded, a significant blizzard developed across the Upper Midwest of the United States. A cyclone developed over the Rocky Mountains on November 24 and traveled eastward, bringing heavy snowfall and gusty winds to the majority of North and South Dakota, with as much as 8 inches (20 cm) falling and leading to multiple road closures on interstates, including I-94 and I-29, in addition to also causing delays. Very high wind gusts as a result of a pressure gradient between the storm and high pressure to its west also occurred across the Dakotas and surrounding regions, peaking as high as 78 mph (126 km/h) in at least two towns. Blizzard conditions were also verified in Aberdeen, South Dakota. The system intensified as it tracked across Minnesota, leading to blizzard warnings being issued for the Upper Peninsula of Michigan and northern Wisconsin, where the heaviest snow totals, enhanced by lake-effect snow, occurred in combination with the high winds. The system attained a pressure of 991 mbar while over the Upper Peninsula of Michigan on November 26. In the morning, a man snowblowing was crushed to death by a downed tree in Alden Township, Minnesota due to high winds and heavy wet snow. On that evening, there was a report of 23 inches (58 cm) of snow from Brule, Wisconsin. Minnesota saw 250 crashes, 30 causing injuries. The system moved into Canada on November 27.

55,000 were without power across Wisconsin, Michigan, and western New York early that morning. A semi tractor-trailer lost control on I-43 outside of Milwaukee and hit two cars, leading to a fatality. By early the morning of November 28, 22 inches (56 cm) fell in Presque Isle, Wisconsin. 2,200 flights had been cancelled by the afternoon due to the storm. Thousands lost power in southern Ontario, though was restored by midday on November 28. A total of 33 inches (84 cm) fell in Gile, Wisconsin. Lake-effect snow began to diminish on November 29, and all lake effect snow warnings expired. Snowfall was reported in the Northeast as well. According to AON, the storm caused $250 million in damages in the United States.

=== Late November–early December winter storms ===
Following the blizzard, two more winter storms followed in quick succession in late November into early December, leading to a wide stretch of accumulating snow from the Plains to northern New England.

==== First storm (November 29–30) ====
- Category 2 "Significant" (RSI/NOAA: 3.994)
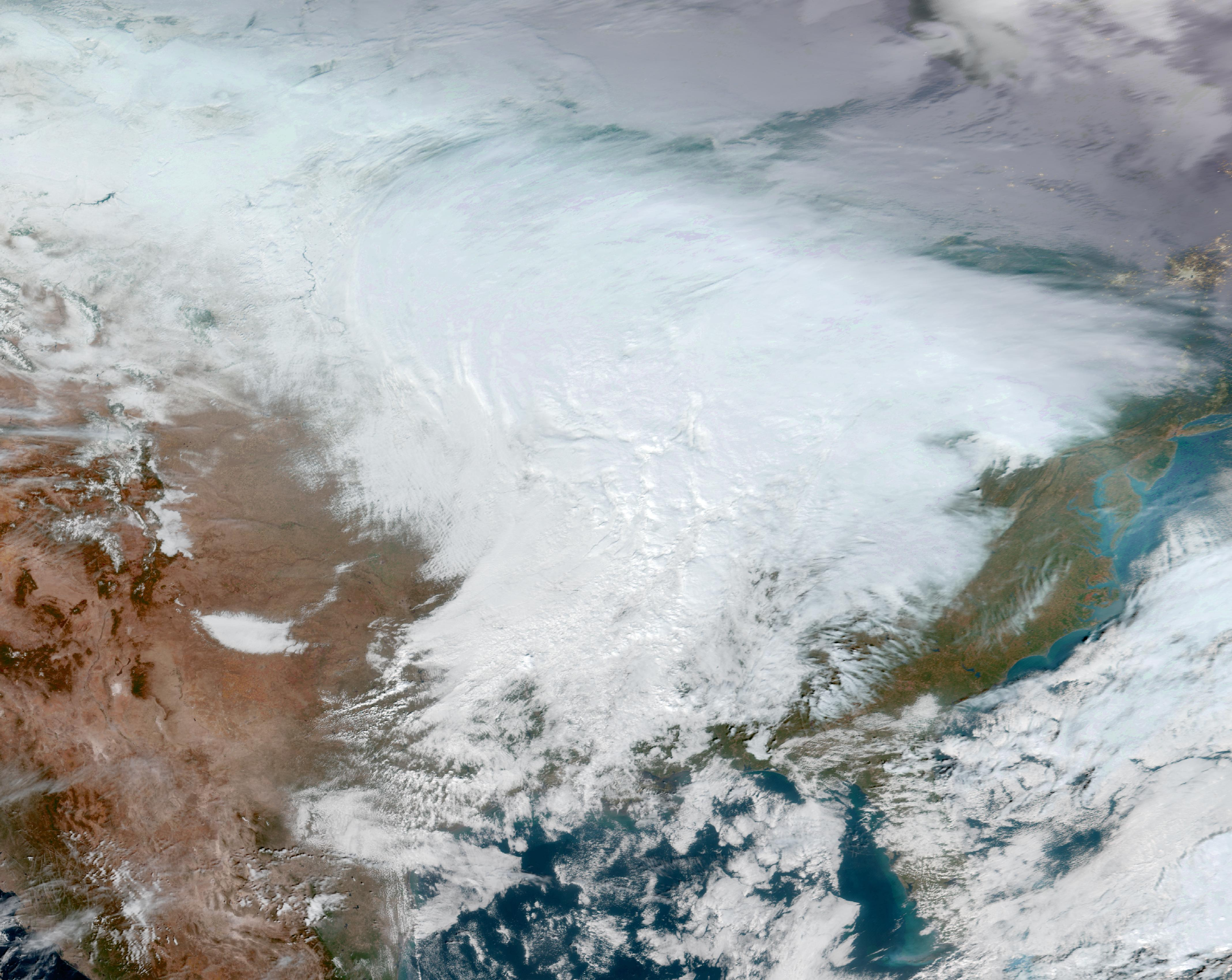
- Duration: November 28 – November 30, 2025
- Lowest pressure: 1006 mb (29.71 inHg)
- Maximum snow: 16.5 in (42 cm)
- Fatalities: 1 fatalities
- Damage: $335,000 (2025 USD)

Another winter storm impacted the United States right after Thanksgiving. A storm moved into the Pacific Northwest on the night of November 27 and into the Rockies on November 28. The storm had moved out of the Plains early on the morning of November 29. Chicago set a new record for the snowiest November day with 8.4 inches (21 cm) at O'Hare International Airport and the second highest single-day total at O'Hare since January 1, 2015. Madison, Wisconsin and Springfield, Illinois also had the snowiest November day on record. Waterloo and Cedar Falls in Iowa had the most snow from a storm on record for November or earlier in fall. By November 30, 15 inches (38 cm) of snow had fallen near Fort Dodge, Iowa as snow continued in New York and New England. Fort Dodge ended up with 16.5 inches (42 cm) and snowfall in New England tapered off as the system moved into southeastern Canada and the Maritimes. 33 centimetres (13 in) was reported in the Stanley Park area of Kitchener, Ontario.

Numerous crashes occurred due to bad road conditions. Iowa State Patrol rescued close to 200 people from ditches by early afternoon on November 29 while a pileup of 45 vehicles occurred on I-70 in Indiana. In Boone County, Indiana, bad conditions led to a death after a pickup truck slid off the road and hit a tree, catching fire. An airplane landing at Des Moines skidded off the runway due to icing. More than 1,900 flights were cancelled. Many ferry crossings in Atlantic Canada were cancelled on December 1 due to adverse weather conditions. Total damages were minimal in the United States, only reaching $335,000 (2025 USD).

==== Second storm (December 1–3) ====
- Category 1 "Notable" (RSI/NOAA: 1.073)
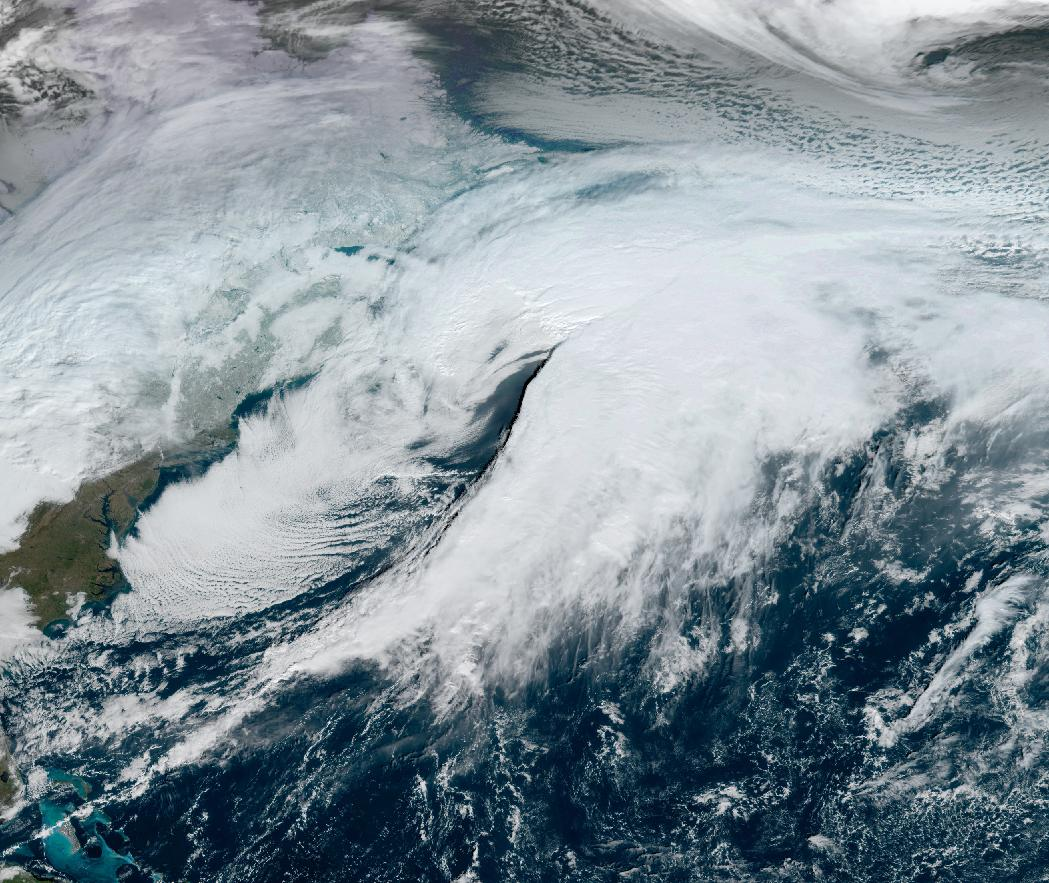
- Duration: December 1 – December 3, 2025
- Lowest pressure: 972 mb (28.70 inHg)
- Maximum snow: 17.3 in (44 cm)
- Fatalities: 2 fatalities

Yet another winter storm impacted the Midwest as well as the eastern United States and Atlantic Canada in early December. Parts of the Midwest saw snow and ice accumulations on December 1. 3–5 inches (7.6–12.7 cm) of snow was seen in Kansas City. Roads in some areas of Oklahoma and Arkansas had a glaze of ice. Indianapolis police reported over 150 crashes since the snow began on November 30. Slick conditions caused many crashes, including four resulting in injuries and one leading to a fatality, in the evening along Route 179 in Missouri. New Jersey Governor, Phil Murphy, declared a state of emergency for several counties in northwestern New Jersey which took effect at 5 A.M. EST on December 2. Snow fell across the Ohio Valley and the Northeast, with 6–12 inches (15–30 cm) of snow falling in parts of Pennsylvania to southern Vermont. 17.3 inches (44 cm) fell in Cattaraugus, New York. Freezing rain led to ice accumulations across the Mid-Atlantic and Northeast, with 0.40 inches (1.0 cm) of ice near Durbin, West Virginia. The main precipitation for the I-95 corridor from Washington, D.C. to Boston was rain. Nantucket saw a gust of 53 miles per hour (85 km/h). Pennsylvania State Police responded to over 280 motor vehicle crashes and about 300 disabled motorists across Pennsylvania. Almost 7,000 flights were delayed and nearly 250 were cancelled in the United States. More than 2,200 power outages occurred in Connecticut. The system strengthened as it moved towards the Canadian Maritimes late on December 2, becoming a bomb cyclone. Strong winds on the morning of December 3 led to almost 30,000 homes and businesses losing power across Nova Scotia. Mainly rain fell on the Atlantic side of Nova Scotia, with 37–55 millimetres (1.5–2.2 in) of rain reported in the Halifax Area. Snowfall occurred elsewhere in Nova Scotia and New Brunswick, with an estimated 30 centimetres (12 in) reported in Springhill, Nova Scotia. Strong winds, rain, and snow contributed to 13 motor vehicle accidents on Cape Breton, with one resulting in a death. The storm continued to intensify as it passed south of Newfoundland, attaining a pressure of 972 mbar late on December 3. Sporadic power outages and several road accidents occurred in Newfoundland.

=== December cold wave ===
Throughout the first half of the month of December, the disruption of the polar vortex created a pattern in which bitterly cold temperatures spilled south into the United States, leading to many places experiencing their coldest start to the month of December in years.

A winter storm in mid-December then brought another round of arctic air across the Midwest in its wake. Extreme cold warnings were in effect until the afternoon of December 14. Minneapolis-Saint Paul International Airport saw temperatures of −10 °F (−23 °C) on the morning of December 14, with some areas as low as −22 °F (−30 °C). Cold temperatures also occurred in Fargo, North Dakota which saw −29 °F (−34 °C), as well as Milwaukee which saw −15 °F (−26 °C). Extreme Cold Watches were in place on the morning of December 14 from eastern Georgia to the Carolinas. Cold weather advisories were in effect for parts of southeastern Georgia and southwestern North Carolina as well.

Temperatures in Alaska were colder than average beginning around December 5. Chicken had a low of −62 °F (−52 °C). Fairbanks recorded the eighth-coldest December on record. The city had temperatures of −43 °F (−42 °C) at the end of December 31.

On December 23, Braeburn, Yukon reached a temperature of −55.7 °C (−68.3 °F), the coldest December temperature in Canada since 1975. It was also the lowest for Canada since January 1999. Dawson City and Mayo, Yukon remained at or below −40 °C (−40 °F) for nineteen days in a row.

December 2025 finished as the coldest December since 2010 in New York City, at 5.3 °F (2.9 °C) below average. Youngstown, Ohio recorded their 21st coldest December on record. The mean temperature for December in Whitehorse, Yukon was −26.1 °C (−15.0 °F), the third-coldest December on record.

=== Mid-December winter storms ===
==== First storm (December 13–15) ====
- Category 0 "Nuisance" (RSI/NOAA: N/A)
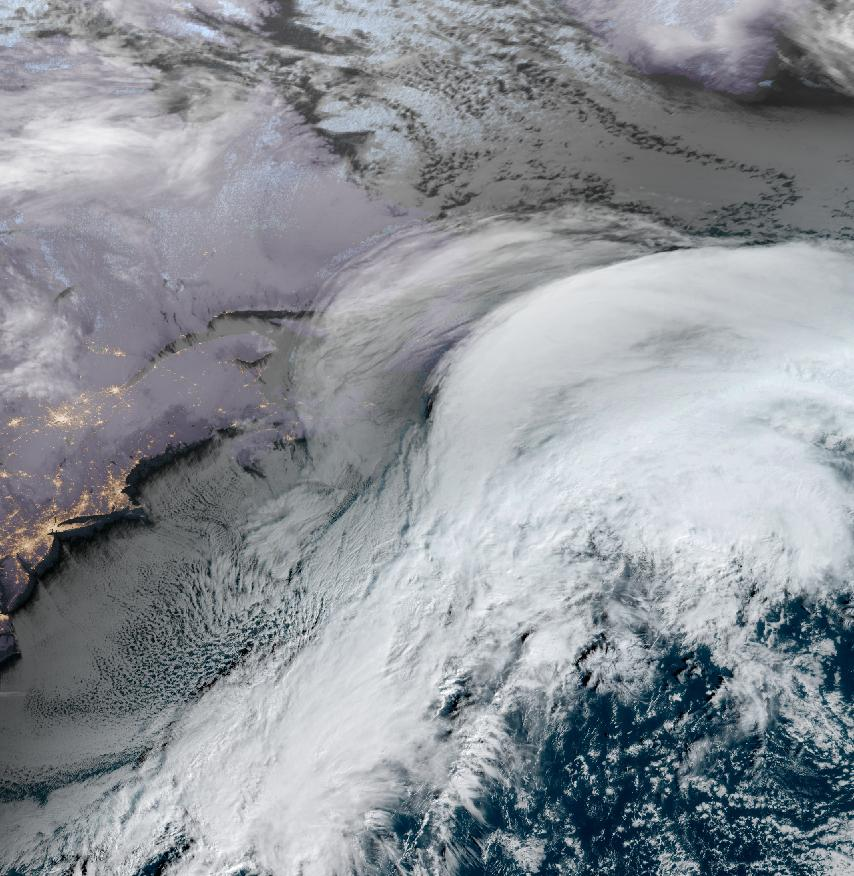
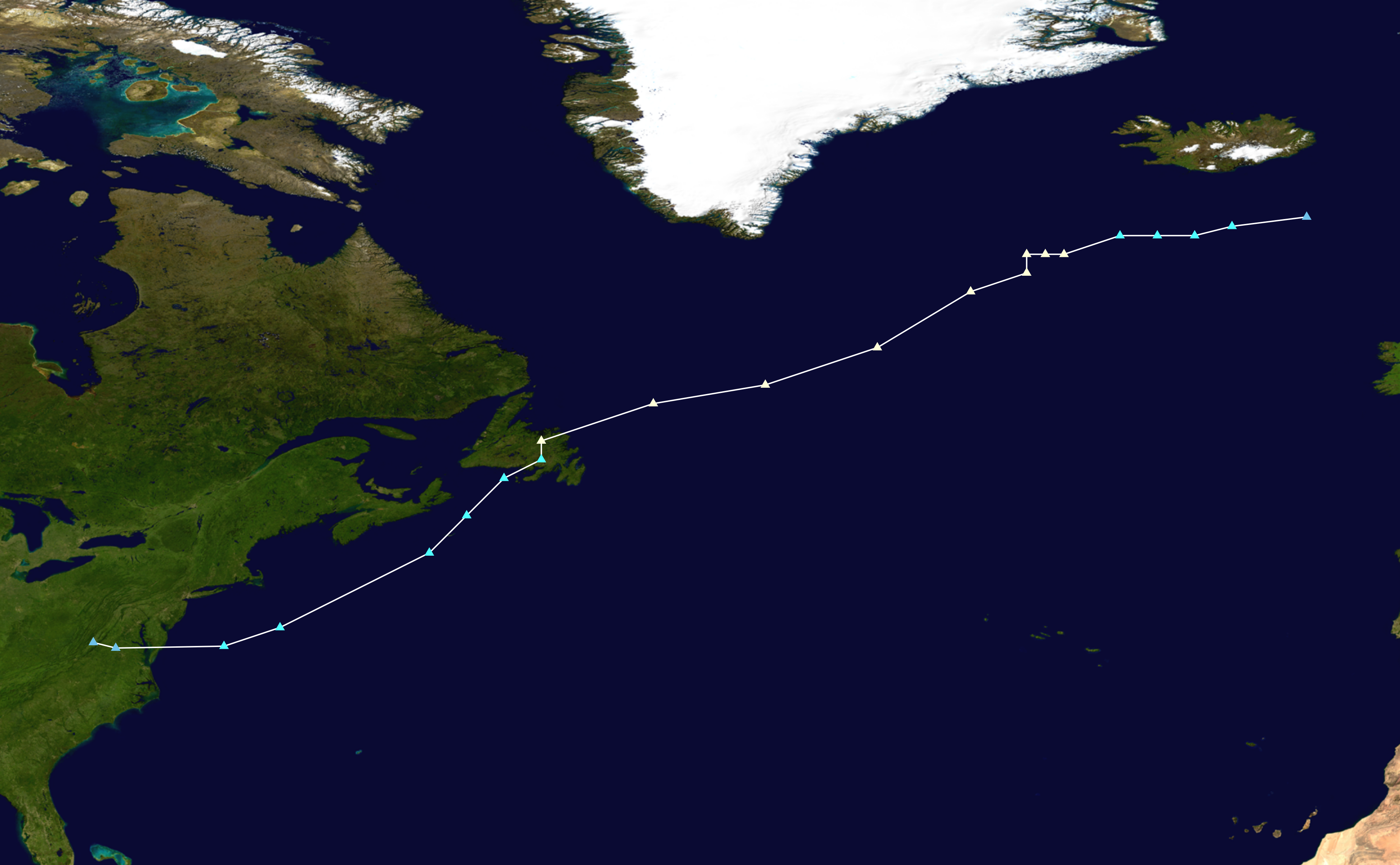
- Duration: December 12 – December 15, 2025
- Lowest pressure: 938 mb (27.70 inHg)
- Maximum snow: 23.7 in (60 cm)
- Fatalities: 6 fatalities

A major winter storm affected the Midwest and the Northeastern United States in mid-December. The winter storm impacted the Midwest on December 13. The system originated near the Canada–United States border on December 12 as a disturbance along an arctic front that was quickly moving southeastwards towards the Great Plains. After dropping a wide swath of moderate snowfall stretching from the state of North Dakota to Ohio the following day, the system eventually redeveloped off the coast of the Delmarva Peninsula overnight as a coastal low on December 13–14, bringing widespread snowfall accumulations of 6–12 inches (15–30 cm) across the Mid-Atlantic and New England states, ending by the afternoon.

The snowfall led to dangerous conditions on roads in Illinois. I-55 was closed near Springfield, Illinois due to a multi-vehicle crash that in a fatality. Another multi-vehicle crash resulted in a death on I-57 due to slick conditions. The winter storm left at least 2,000 people without power in Mercer County, New Jersey on December 14. About 41,100 people across Pennsylvania, New Jersey, New York, and Ohio lost power. In New York City, the 1, A and R lines experienced delays. Central Park recorded their earliest in-season inch of snow since December 2, 2019. Ground stops were implemented at both John F. Kennedy International Airport and Philadelphia International Airport. Perrysburg, New York, saw 23.7 inches (60 cm) of snow. In Atlantic Canada, where the storm struck after rapidly intensifying, warnings were issued in most of Newfoundland and the coast of Labrador. Northern Newfoundland were under orange winter storm or wind warnings as well as a coastal flooding statement for the eastern and northeastern coastline. Health services were cancelled or had delayed openings. The strong winds led to ferry cancellations on December 15 as well as the cancellation of two ferries for December 16.

==== Second storm (December 17–20) ====
- Category 0 "Nuisance" (RSI/NOAA: N/A)
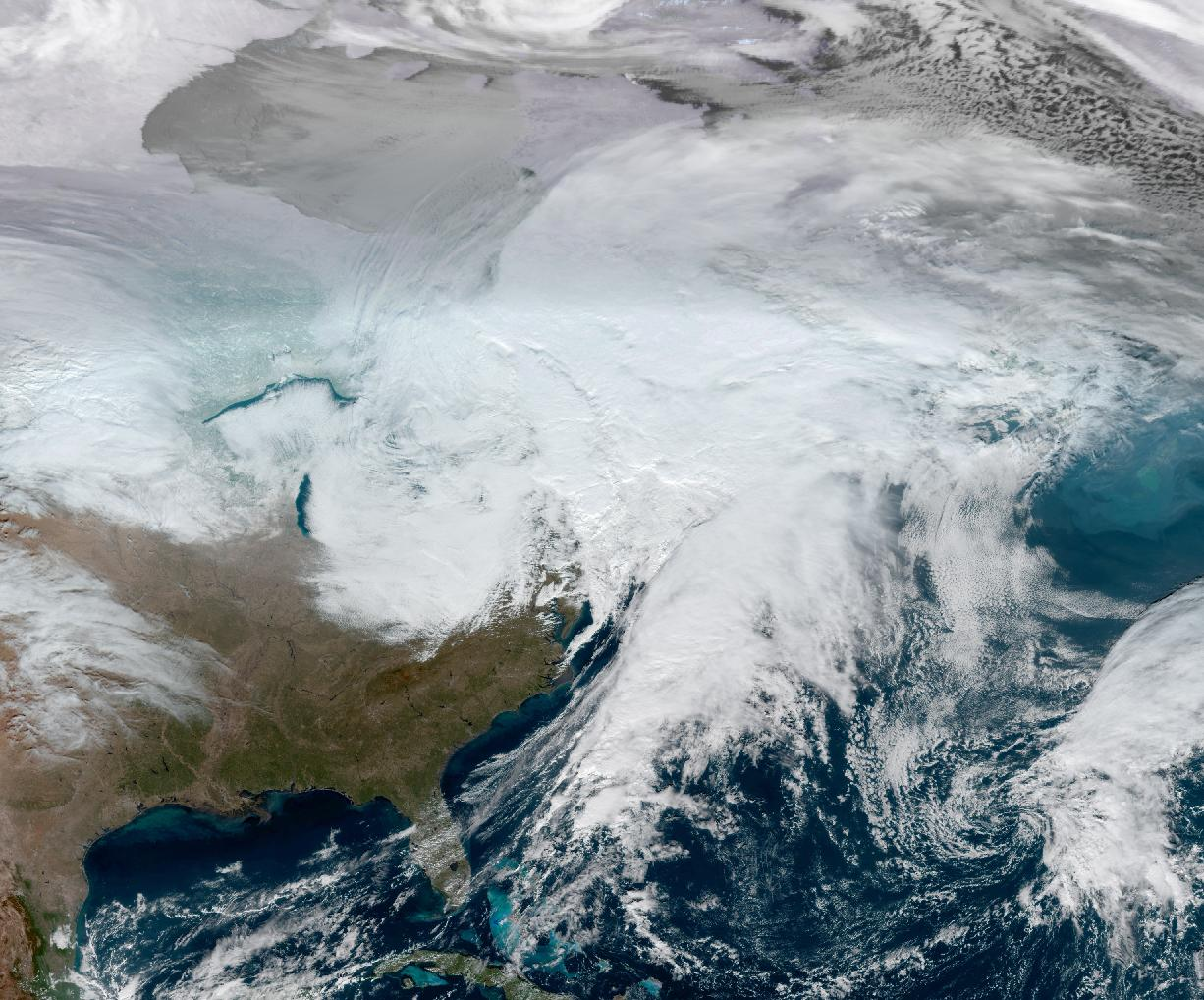
- Duration: December 17 – December 20, 2025
- Lowest pressure: 945 mb (27.91 inHg)
- Maximum snow: 12 in (30 cm)
- Damage: > $735 million (2025 USD)

Between December 17 and December 20, 2025 a historic and multifaceted weather event that impacted the Western and Central United States. The event was characterized by hurricane-force wind gusts, record-breaking winter temperatures, and a "Particularly Dangerous Situation" (PDS) for wildfire risk in Colorado and Kansas. The storm affected Montana, Wyoming, New Mexico, Oklahoma, and Texas as well. 16 states were affected. The storm also caused power outages across the United States as well as a fatality when a tree fell into a home in Idaho. Near blizzard conditions occurred in parts of the Upper Midwest and Great Lakes, with a maximum snowfall total of 12 in (30 cm) reported near Dupuyer, Montana. On December 19, Bridgeford, Connecticut set daily rainfall record. A tree fell on a person in British Columbia. Many accidents occurred, with one in Saskatchewan leading to fatality. 25 cm (9.8 in) of snow accumulated in Rosetown, Saskatchewan. Ferry crossings were cancelled in Atlantic Canada. Some flight delays and cancellations occurred in the Halifax Stanfield International Airport. Damages totaled to $735 million in the United States according to Gallagher Re.

=== Post-Christmas Northern U.S. bomb cyclone ===
Shortly after the previous winter storm, a blizzard affected the Upper Midwest and the Northeastern United States as well as Eastern Canada. The storm developed over the Midwest. It rapidly intensified as it moved over the Great Lakes region on December 28. Strong winds occurred with a gust of 76 mph (122 km/h) recorded northwest of Wasta, South Dakota. Buffalo, New York saw a gust of 79 mph (127 km/h), the strongest since 1980, and close to the New York statewide record. Marquette, Michigan set new daily records of 11.5 in (29 cm) on December 28 and 15.9 in (40 cm) on December 29, with a total of more than 27 in (69 cm). Along the cold front, tornadoes occurred in parts of Illinois in the afternoon and evening on December 28. As the cold front passed through St. Louis, the temperature dropped from a high of 77 °F (25 °C) to a low of 22 °F (−6 °C), the largest daily temperature drop in December. Many crashes occurred due to dangerous conditions leading to road closures in Iowa, with one leading to a death on December 29. Crashes also occurred in Minnesota and Michigan, with 31 in Minnesota causing injuries. Over 350,000 customers across the United States lost power, 115,000 of which was in Michigan. Strong winds in the south also caused power outages with almost 30,000 in Texas. Over 9,000 flights were cancelled and around 850 were cancelled in the United States. Over 2 ft (61 cm) of snow fell in some areas in far northern Wisconsin and 24 in (61 cm) of snow was reported east of Champion, Michigan. A car pileup happened in Detroit on I-75 that involved two dozen cars. This accident was caused by whiteout conditions caused by a snow squall.

The system moved into Ontario, deepening to a pressure of 978 mb (28.9 inHg) as it approached Quebec. Roughly 61,000 in Ontario lost power from ice accumulating trees and downing power lines. Power was restored to over 88,000 customers in Ontario from December 28–29. Lake Superior Provincial Park saw 26 cm (10 in) of snow by 5 P.M. Around 10 flights were cancelled and over 60 flights were delayed in Montreal, Toronto, and London. By 3 P.M., roughly 20,000 were without power in Quebec. Ottawa saw a total of 18 mm (0.71 in) rain and freezing rain. 2,000 lost power in New Brunswick. Crashes occurred in the province including a bus crash that led to 7 injuries. Freezing rain occurred across the Northeastern United States as it moved through southern Quebec and Maine. 0.64 in (16 mm) of freezing rain fell near Amsterdam, New York. A maximum snow total of 24.5 in (62 cm) was recorded in Eckerman, Michigan. Up to 0.5 in (13 mm) of ice accumulated in parts of northern New England and northern New York. By the morning of December 30, more than 10,000 customers were without power in New Brunswick. According to AON, the storm caused $100 million in the United States and $70 million in damages in Canada.

=== January–February cold wave ===
A major and prolonged cold wave took hold of North America in the second half of January. The first blast of cold air impacted most of the United States on January 19, with International Falls, Minnesota bottoming out at −20 °F (−29 °C). After a brief respite, colder temperatures returned the next weekend. On January 23, Chicago logged a temperature of −11 °F (−24 °C) and a wind chill of −36 °F (−38 °C), the coldest up to that point. On January 24, record low high temperatures were set at many sites across the New York Metropolitan area. That day, a daily record low of −34 °F (−37 °C) was set in Watertown, New York. Eastern Iowa experienced wind chill values below −40 °F (−40 °C). A 51-year-old man died from cold exposure in Des Moines. Additionally, a 19-year-old college student was found dead in Ann Arbor, Michigan, after going missing without a coat in frigid conditions. Elsewhere in Michigan, Grand Rapids recorded a low temperature of −19 °F (−28 °C) on the morning of January 24, which was the coldest temperature recorded in the area since 1994. That same morning, Flint recorded a low temperature of −24 °F (−31 °C), just one degree above the all time record low for the area. Following the January 2026 North American winter storm, extreme cold re-asserted itself over much of the United States. On January 27, Washington D.C. hit a low of 13 °F (−11 °C), and the cold wave would push into Florida. While record highs affected the Miami metropolitan area on January 26 with highs near 90 °F (32 °C), many areas across the metro reported lows of 48–51 °F (9–11 °C) on January 27. Cleveland, Ohio recorded eight consecutive days with high temperatures of 17 °F (−8 °C) or below, January 24−31, tying records from 1893 and 1899. Cold temperatures led ice forming on Lake Erie. A rider was rescued after their ATV smashed through ice seven miles offshore. Near Port Clinton on February 3, two fishermen were rescued from frigid waters after their vehicle broke through a crack in the ice. 96% of Lake Erie froze by February 5, the highest since 1996. A large crack began to form in the ice on February 8.

Three towns in Saskatchewan broke cold weather records on January 22. In response to the cold, Regina, Saskatchewan opened three warming centers to shelter the homeless or vulnerable. Kirkland Lake, Ontario saw a temperature of −43.7 °C (−46.7 °F) early on January 24, the coldest since 1984. The Toronto Pearson Airport, Trenton, and London had the coldest temperatures in several years that day as well. On January 26, cold temperatures in Quebec led to power outages, during which two were found dead in Montreal. 22 deaths were directly attributed to the cold.

Felipe Carrillo Puerto, Mexico had the coldest temperature in over 40 years, recording 4.2 °C (39.6 °F) on the morning of February 2. Other cities in Quintana Roo saw temperatures not seen in decades, such as Playa Del Carmen, José María Morelos, Chetumal, and Cancún. Agencies in Quintana Roo handed out free blankets due to the cold. Due to the cold and another incoming cold front, the National Meteorological Service issued an advisory that same day.

The arctic front reached the Caribbean. The coldest high temperature ever on record for the Bahamas was recorded in Freeport on February 1 at 51 °F (11 °C). The Indio Hatuey weather station at Perico, Cuba set a national all-time record low of 32 °F (0 °C) on the morning of February 3, the first freezing temperature on record anywhere in Cuba. Frost was reported on crops around the weather station. Four other stations either tied or broke all-time records. Six other stations tied or set February records as well.

In Central America on February 1, Flores, Guatemala saw 48 °F (9 °C), tying with an all time-record low. The Finca Los Andes mountain weather station in western El Salvador set a new February record of 38 °F (3 °C). Belize recorded a low of 42 °F (6 °C), the coldest since 1968.

The arctic air also impacted Bermuda. A preliminary temperature reading on February 8 measured 6.6 °C (43.9 °F) on the island, breaking the record set in 1950.

=== Late January winter storm ===
- Category 3 "Major" (RSI/NOAA: 6.739)
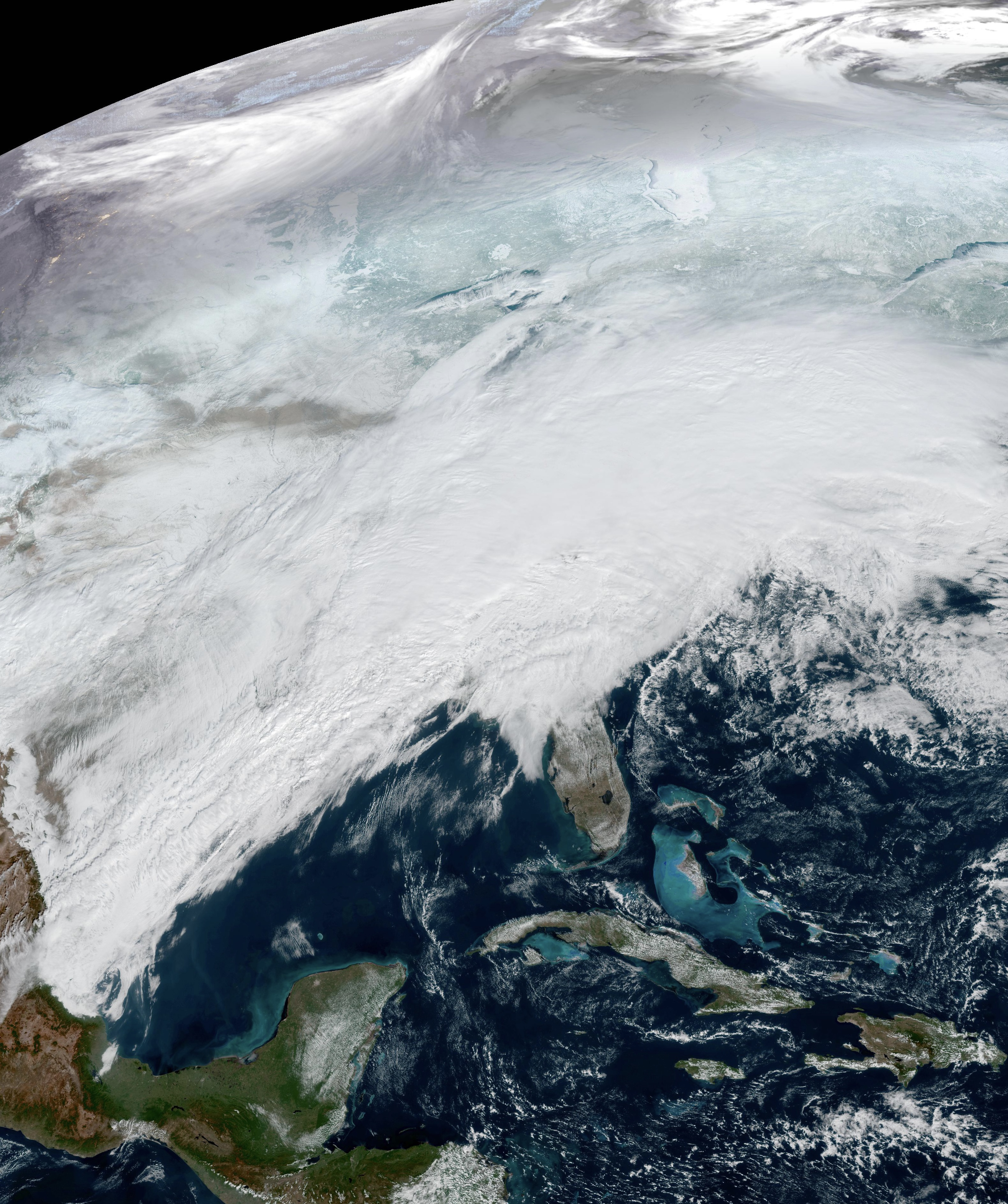
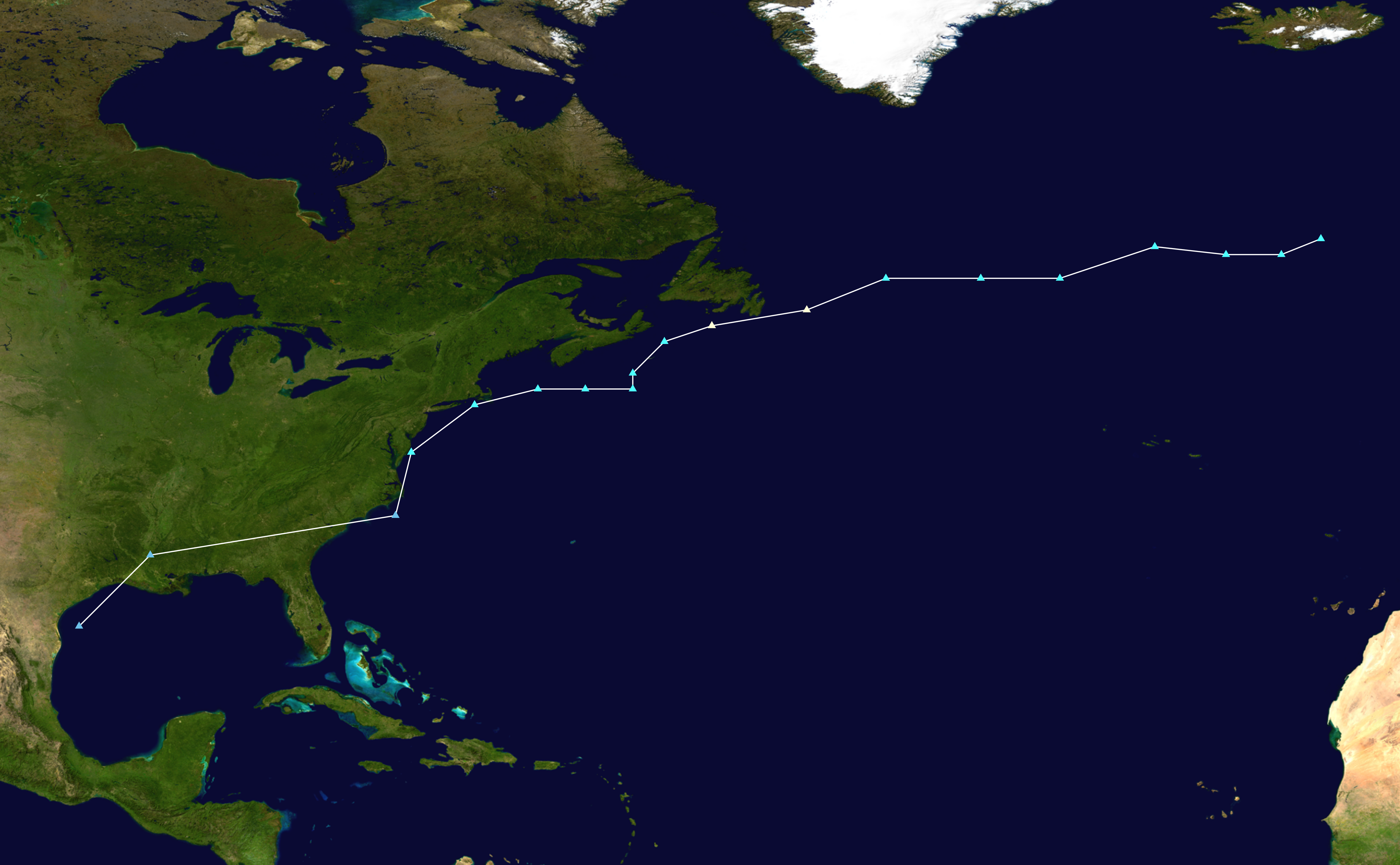
- Duration: January 23 – January 27, 2026
- Lowest pressure: 958 mb (28.29 inHg)
- Maximum snow: 31 in (79 cm)
- Fatalities: 174 fatalities
- Damage: > $4 billion (2026 USD)

A major winter storm began affecting a large portion of North America on January 23. The storm first developed on January 22 in the Pacific Ocean as a cold-core low moving southeastwards towards the Baja California peninsula. Due to the immense size and expected impact of the winter storm, a NOAA Gulfstream IV-SP was sent into the system to collect data in order to improve forecasting. The system developed over the Great Plains midday January 23. On January a low pressure wave had settled along a cold front near the Gulf Coast, met by a barometric ridge over the Plains. The system later underwent Miller B type cyclogenesis as a new coastal low developed off the coast of the Southeast on January 25, strengthening as it moved northwards near New England offshore south of Cape Cod early the following day. Overall, a large swath of snowfall ranging from 1–2 feet (12–24 in; 30–61 cm) occurred from Texas to Maine, and in some cases (particularly in the South) broke daily snowfall records. In the Mid-Atlantic states and Northeast, where the storm became a nor'easter, several locations along the I-95 corridor, specifically Philadelphia, Pennsylvania, and New York City, saw their heaviest snowfall accumulation from this storm in five years since a nor'easter in February 2021.

Several U.S. state governors issued emergency declarations in response. At least 62 deaths have been attributed to the storm in the US across multiple states. 1 million people lost power as a result of the storm, primarily in Texas, Louisiana, the Mississippi Delta, and the southern Ohio River basin. That number still rested around 700,000 by mid-day on January 26. Meteorologists from the National Weather Service estimated that there were around 300 million people under winter precipitation and/or cold warnings or advisories. The storm affected at least nine radio stations across the country, most in the South, particularly in Georgia and Mississippi, though specific affected stations were not noted. Central Park reported a daily record of snow, at 11.4 in (29 cm). Meanwhile, Pittsburgh saw 11.2 in (28 cm), its highest snowfall total since the February 5-6, 2010 North American blizzard, with many areas in the region seeing near 18 in (46 cm). The city of Nashville set a new precipitation record on January 24, with 1.92 in (49 mm) of precipitation. Some of that was freezing rain, leading to the worst ice storm in decades for the region. A driver died in a single-vehicle crash in Dyersburg, Tennessee. As many as 300,000 people were estimated to have lost power as a result of damaging ice accumulation. Numerous other accidents were reported; officials stated that residents should stay off the roads unless absolutely necessary. An estimated $4 billion in damages was estimated to have been caused by the winter storm.

In Canada, Toronto Pearson International Airport reported its largest single-day snowfall since records began in 1937, receiving a total of 46 cm (18 in). A potent lake-enhanced snow band stalled over much of Toronto for several hours, prompting Toronto to activate its major snow response plan for the second time in 2026 just prior to 5 pm. The Ontario Provincial Police responded to around 100 car crashes over 24 hours. A Bombardier Global 6500 also skidded off the taxiway after landing at Pearson Airport; no injuries were reported. By 5:30 pm, roughly 50 centimetres (20 in) fell in parts of the core of Toronto. This caused all Greater Toronto Area Schools and Boards to close. Many post-secondary institutions also closed notably, University of Toronto, York University, and Toronto Metropolitan University. Further east, 14 cm (5.5 in) of snow was recorded at both Ottawa and Montreal. Schools and buses resumed operations on January 27.

=== Pre-Groundhog Day nor'easter ===
- Category 2 "Significant" (RSI/NOAA: 5.348)
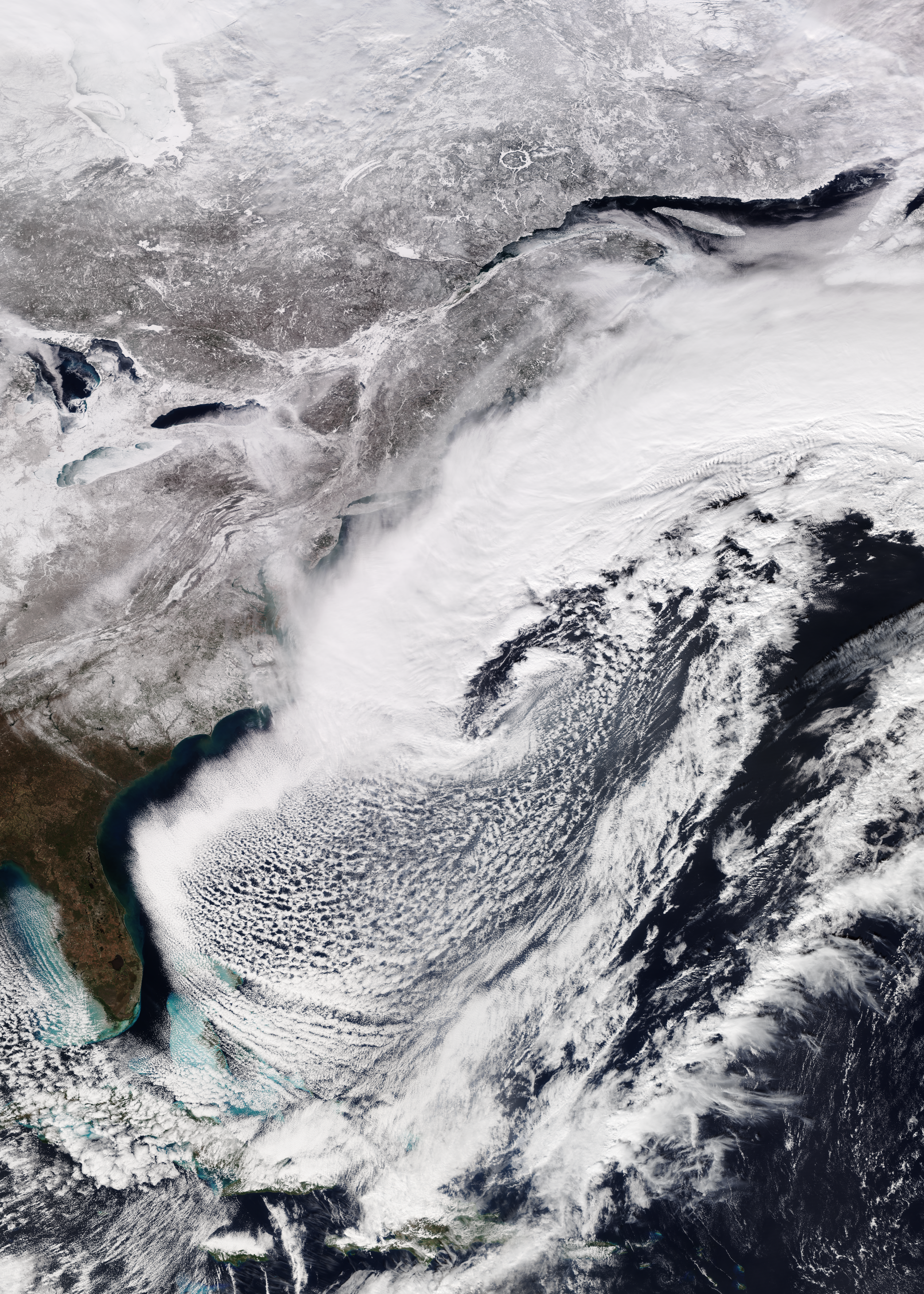
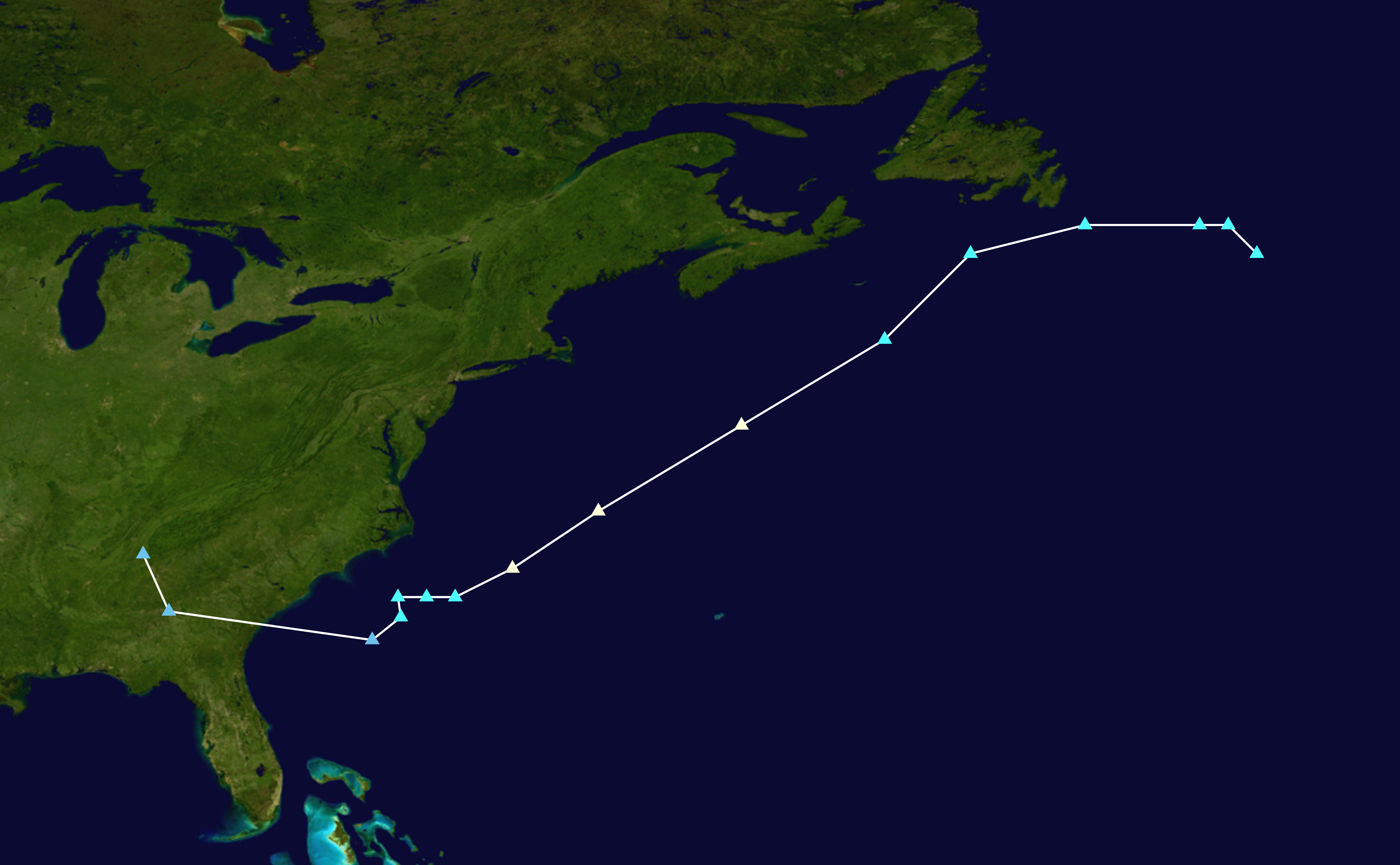
- Duration: January 31 – February 2, 2026
- Lowest pressure: 964 mb (28.47 inHg)
- Maximum snow: 22.3 in (57 cm)
- Fatalities: 13 fatalities
- Damage: $550 million (2026 USD)

Near the end of January, another significant winter storm impacted the Southeast just after the aforementioned historic ice storm. North Carolina and Georgia declared states of emergencies while Virginia and South Carolina extended their states of emergencies from the previous storm. Snow began the night of January 30 in parts of the Southeast. By 11:30 a.m. on January 31, Maggie Valley, North Carolina and Greeneville, Tennessee both had 9 in (23 cm) of snow. Charlotte Douglass International Airport tied with a December 1880 winter storm for the fourth-highest single-day snow total with 11 in (28 cm) of snow on January 31. By the morning of February 1, many areas recorded snow totals in excess of 8 in (20 cm), with up to 16 in (41 cm) reported in Lexington, North Carolina, and 13.5 in (34 cm) in Pigeon Forge, Tennessee. Strong winds in coastal areas of the Carolinas, including the outer banks, were reported, with gusts of 50–60 mph (80–97 km/h) being common. These winds resulted in near-blizzard conditions for these areas.

Between January 30 and 4:30 a.m. on February 1, Virginia State Police saw 263 crashes, 26 with injuries. Not all were weather-related. Two fatal weather-related crashes occurred in Greensville and Fauquier Counties, Virginia. Another fatal accident occurred in Rutherford County, North Carolina. Snow and cold weather indirectly contributed to a death in Greene County, Tennessee. A crash with a minor injury occurred on I-985 in Georgia on January 31. Snow flurries were reported in parts of the Florida Panhandle and as far south as Tampa, St. Petersburg, and Clearwater on the afternoon and evening of January 31 as a result of the powerful cold front having passed through. Additionally, a tightening pressure gradient allowed for widespread strong wind gusts of 40–54 mph (64–87 km/h) across much of the State of Florida; the highest gust recorded being in Gainesville. This was followed by record low temperatures into the morning of February 1 all across Florida, with most of the state being under extreme cold warnings due to very low wind chills. Gale-force winds and heavy rain occurred in Bermuda. Almost 2,300 customers lost power by the evening of January 31. Flooding was reported in a few low-lying places. A total of $550 million in damages was caused by the storm, primarily in the Carolinas.

=== February West Coast atmospheric rivers ===
In mid-February, a series of winter storms began impacting the West Coast of the United States, leading to extremely heavy snowfall. Snow began in California on the night of Sunday, February 15. The deep trough moved onshore into the West Coast on February 16. On February 17, a second system impacted the region. By February 17, snow accumulation reached 3–6 feet (0.91–1.83 m) in the Sierra Nevada region, where Lake Tahoe is located. Reno, Nevada broke a daily snowfall record with 7.7 inches (20 cm) of snow on February 18. Virginia City had 15 inches (38 cm) of snow and Carson City ranged 7–12 inches (18–30 cm). An upper-level trough impacted California and the third and final low moved onshore on February 19, bringing additional snowfall to the Sierra Nevada. Some stations in the region surpassed 100 inches (250 cm) of snow, with Dodge Ridge reporting 115 inches (290 cm) by the afternoon of February 19. A gust of 77 mph (124 km/h) occurred in Bird Springs Pass. Snowfall occurred on the Oregon Coast Range and Cascade Mountains in Oregon. Mt. Hood Meadows received 4 inches (10 cm) of snowfall by the morning of February 19.

An avalanche warning was issued for the Lake Tahoe region early on the 17th, which remained in effect until February 19. The skiing group left for Frog Lake on February 15. The group consisted of 11 skiers and four tour guides. The trip was meant to last three days and return on February 17. Eight people were killed and one person was missing. All of the deceased were members of a ski group who had been on a guided backcountry excursion at the time of the avalanche. The avalanche was the deadliest in the United States since the 1981 Mount Rainier avalanche. Another fatal skiing accident occurred at the Northstar Ski Resort on February 15. A crash of 40 vehicles on I-80 near Evanston, Wyoming led to 22 injuries and two fatalities on February 18. Avalanches in Utah resulted in two fatalities from February 18–19. Over 74,000 were without power across California by February 19. The storms resulted in school closures in California, Nevada, and Oregon. Several highways were closed in California as well. Yosemite National Park was also shut down due to avalanche risk.

=== Late February blizzard ===
- Category 3 "Major" (RSI/NOAA: 9.69)
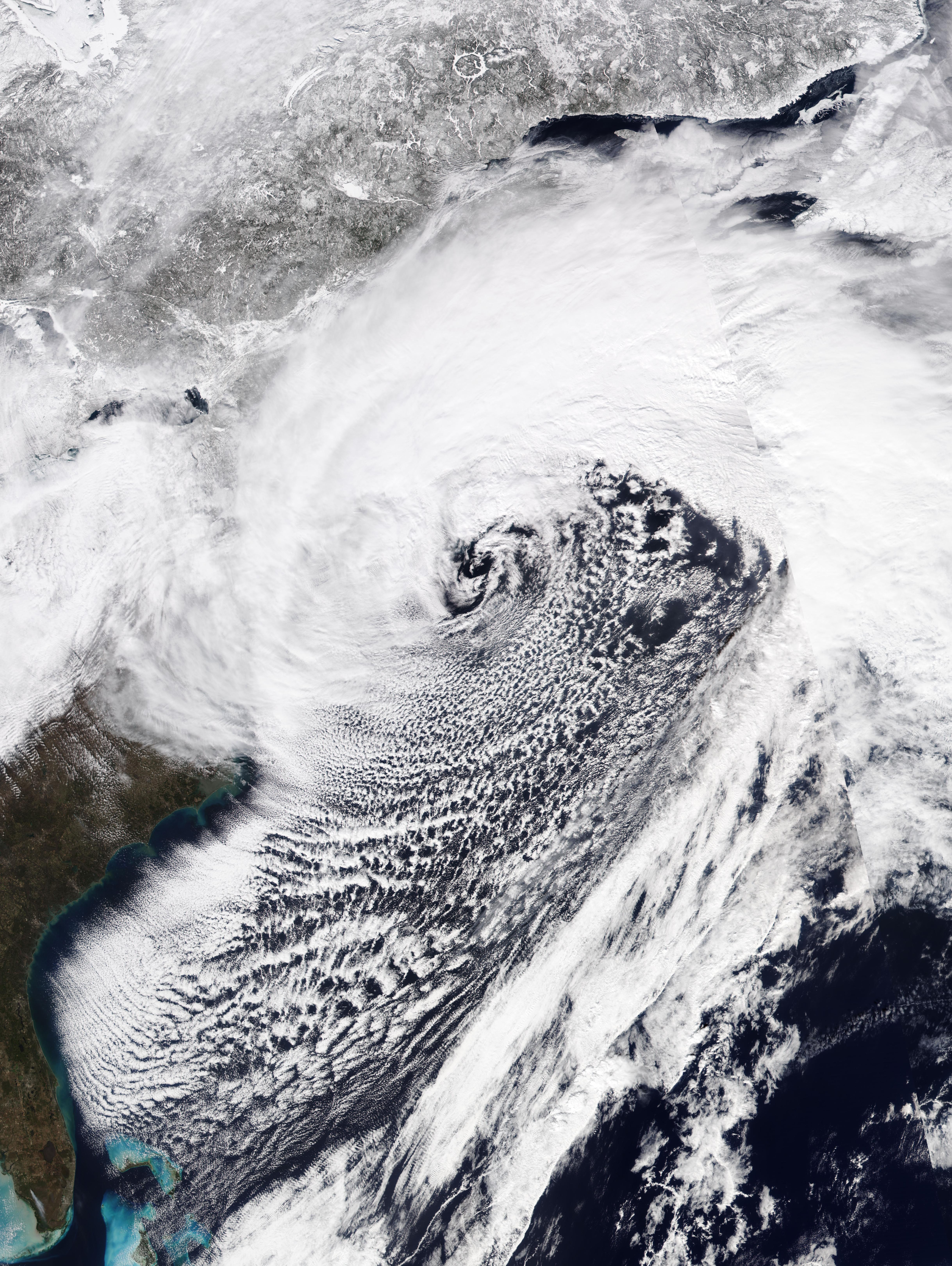
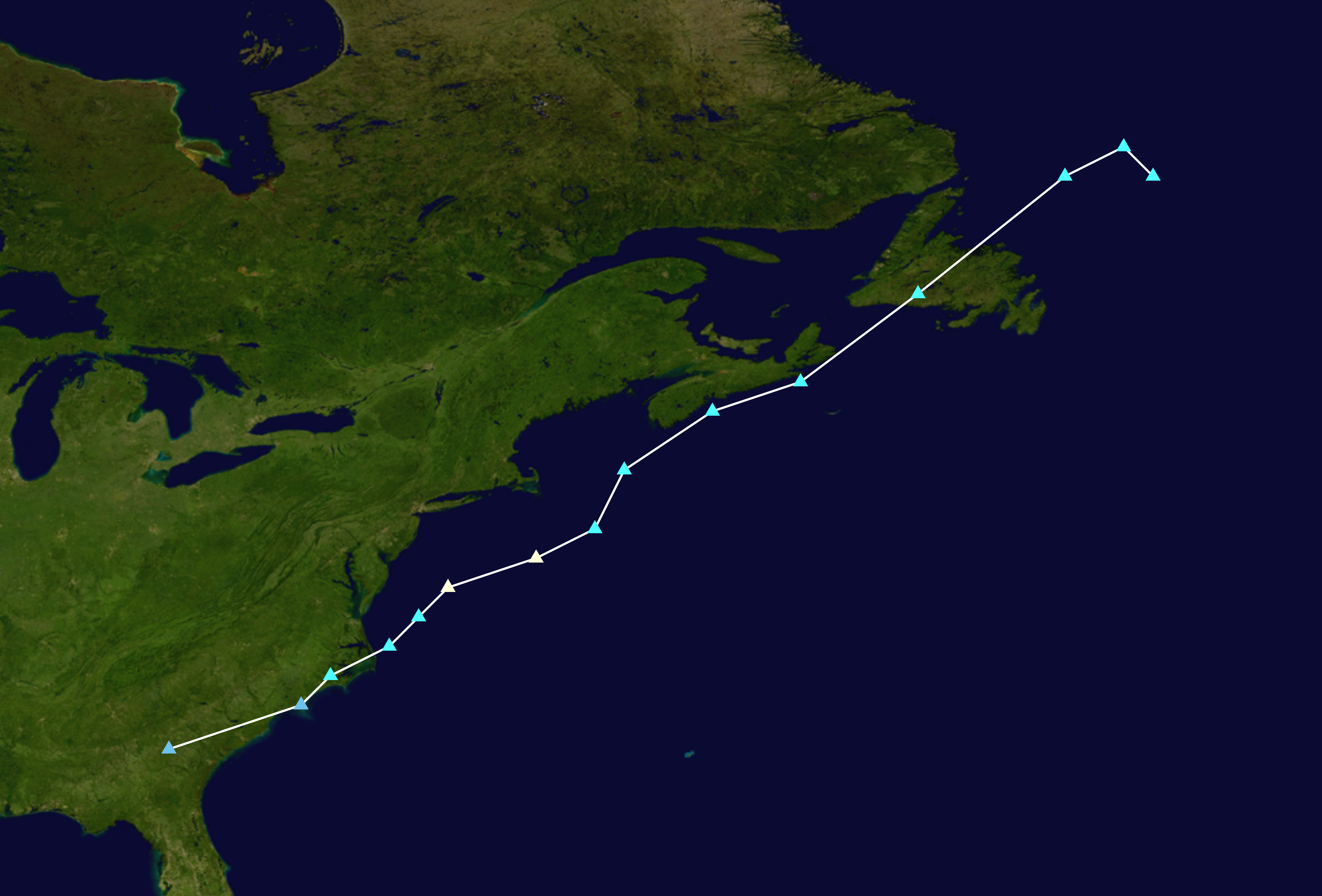
- Duration: February 20 – February 24, 2026
- Lowest pressure: 965 mb (28.50 inHg)
- Maximum snow: 37.9 in (96 cm)
- Fatalities: 30 fatalities
- Damage: $500 million (2026 USD)

A powerful, historic and severe blizzard caused extensive impacts across the Northeastern United States from February 22–24, dropping 2–3 feet (24–36 in; 61–91 cm) of snow across much of the Northeast megalopolis, bringing blizzard conditions, strong gusty winds, and coastal flooding to the shorelines of the region. Originating out of a shortwave trough that moved ashore on the West Coast of the United States on February 20, the system swiftly moved eastwards across the country before beginning to consolidate late the following day. A new surface low developed off the southeastern United States early on February 22 and began moving north, before rapidly strengthening overnight, bringing blizzard conditions and very heavy snowfall to the Northeast corridor on February 23, moving into Atlantic Canada by later that day.

States of emergencies were declared in seven states, including New Jersey, New York and large portions of New England. Heavy precipitation was anticipated for major U.S. metropolitan areas, some of which were predicted to set new records. Blizzard warnings were issued for a majority of northeastern Mid-Atlantic states, the first such in New York City and Boston, respectively, since March 2017 and January 2022. Travel bans were enacted in multiple regions such as New York City and the state of New Jersey. The blizzard was described by some as among the worst to threaten the Northeast since the blizzard of 1996.

30 fatalities from the blizzard have been confirmed: 15 in New Jersey, 6 in New York, 2 each in Connecticut, Maryland, Pennsylvania, and Rhode Island, and one in Massachusetts, respectively. Over 600,000 people lost power at the height of the blizzard due to strong gusty winds. Blizzard conditions were verified across numerous locations, including New Jersey and Massachusetts, with both daily and all-time snowfall records being broken throughout the Northeast. Hurricane-strength wind gusts were reported in New England, nearly reaching 100 mph (160 km/h) in the immediate coastal regions. Coastal flooding caused minor to moderate damage along the Jersey Shore and surrounding waters. As much as $500 million in damages were estimated to have been inflicted across affected areas by the blizzard.

=== Early March winter storms ===
==== First storm (March 5–6) ====
On the cold side of the system, a winter storm affected much of the Rocky Mountains on March 5–6. Heavy snowfall totals were primarily focused in the more mountainous regions where winter storm warnings were issued, with accumulations over 1–2 feet (12–24 in; 30–61 cm); the highest being 26 inches (66 cm). In Denver, Colorado, the city received 8 inches (20 cm), the first snowfall approximately 40 days, owing to a record-warm winter up to that point. Up to 1,302 flights out of Denver International Airport were either delayed or cancelled due to the weather. Roadways in and around the city were also closed as a result.

==== Second storm (March 10–14) ====
- Category 0 "Nuisance" (RSI/NOAA: N/A)
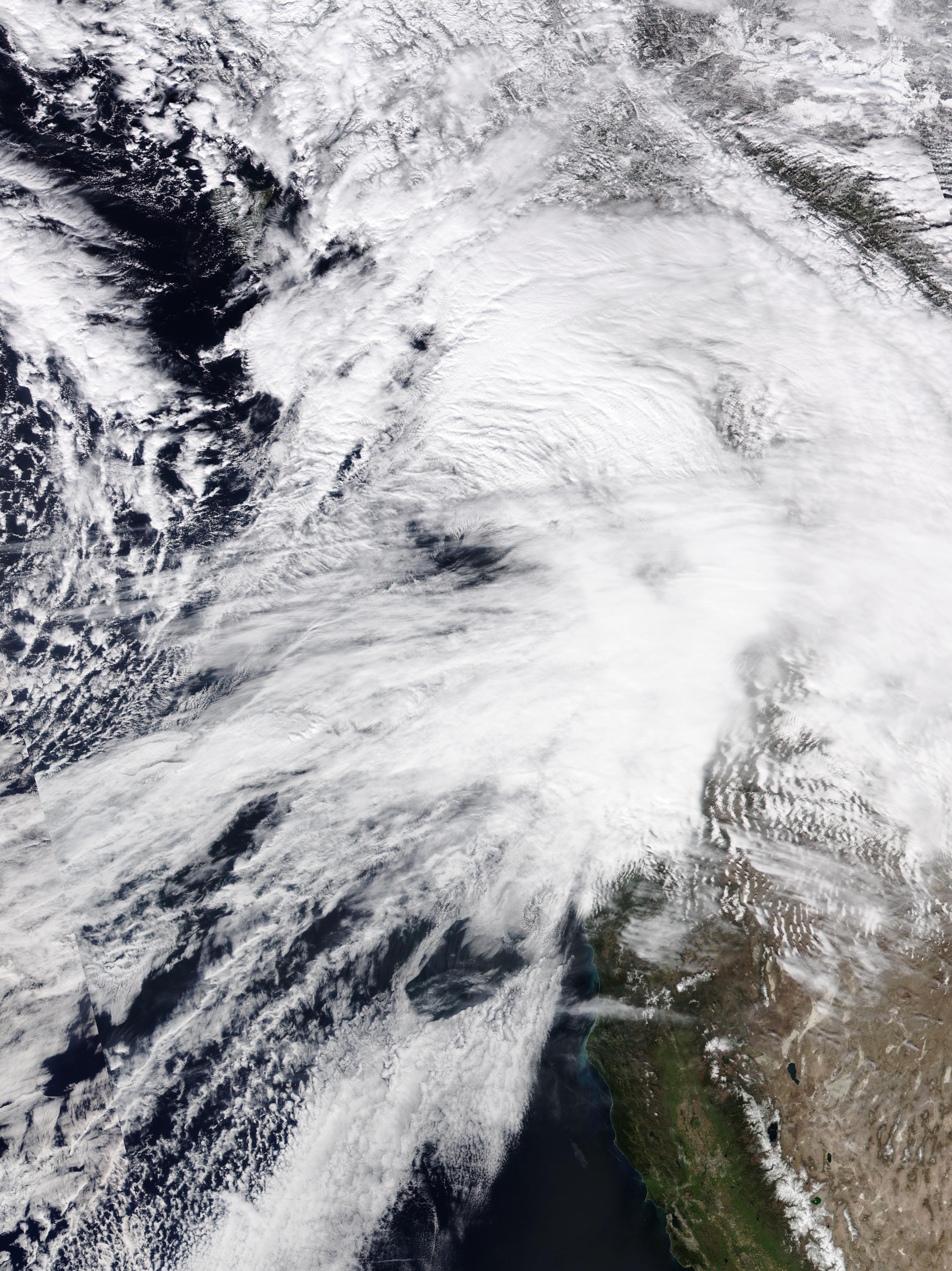
- Duration: March 10 – March 14, 2026
- Lowest pressure: 985 mb (29.09 inHg)
- Fatalities: 1 fatalities
- Damage: $1.9 billion (2026 USD)

Beginning late on March 10, an atmospheric river brought a series of winter storms to the Pacific Northwest. The atmospheric river made landfall in the morning of March 11. Later that evening, persistent gusts of up to 25 mph (40 km/h) were reported in Snohomish County, Washington. A low-pressure system moved into Vancouver Island and the interior of British Columbia that night. The strong low then moved across Alberta and into the Upper Midwest on March 12. The intensifying low created a tight pressure gradient producing powerful gusts of over 100 mph (160 km/h) in parts of the Northern United States Plains on March 13. Cheyenne, Wyoming set a daily gust record and Surprise Pinnacle recorded a gust of 123 mph (198 km/h). The system attained a pressure of 985 mbar (29.1 inHg) over northern Wisconsin at 12:00 UTC. The snow from the clipper began to move into southern Ontario later that day. The system continued through the northern Northeastern United States on March 14, producing snow and strong winds for the region.

One died after strong winds caused a tree to fall onto their car in Monroe, Washington on March 11. In Oregon, Hillsboro and Astoria set rainfall records while Portland tied with its rainfall record. The rainfall resulted in flooding on the Oregon coast and landslides. Over 87,000 lost power across Washington and Idaho by the afternoon of March 12. Hurricane-force winds tipped trucks over on the Coquihalla Highway in British Columbia, causing the highway to close. Over 17,000 customers lost power from March 11–12. The strong winds in the Upper Midwest caused damages and power outages on March 13, with a peak of over 1 million without power. Heavy snowfall occurred in parts of the northern Midwest, with 11 inches (28 cm) of snow in Fond Du Lac, Minnesota by the morning of March 13. Unusually strong gusts were recorded in northern Ohio and Greater Pittsburgh on March 13, causing widespread power outages. Accidents due from bad conditions caused several highways in Ontario to close.

=== Mid-March blizzard & cold snap ===
- Category 5 "Extreme" (RSI/NOAA: 26.967)
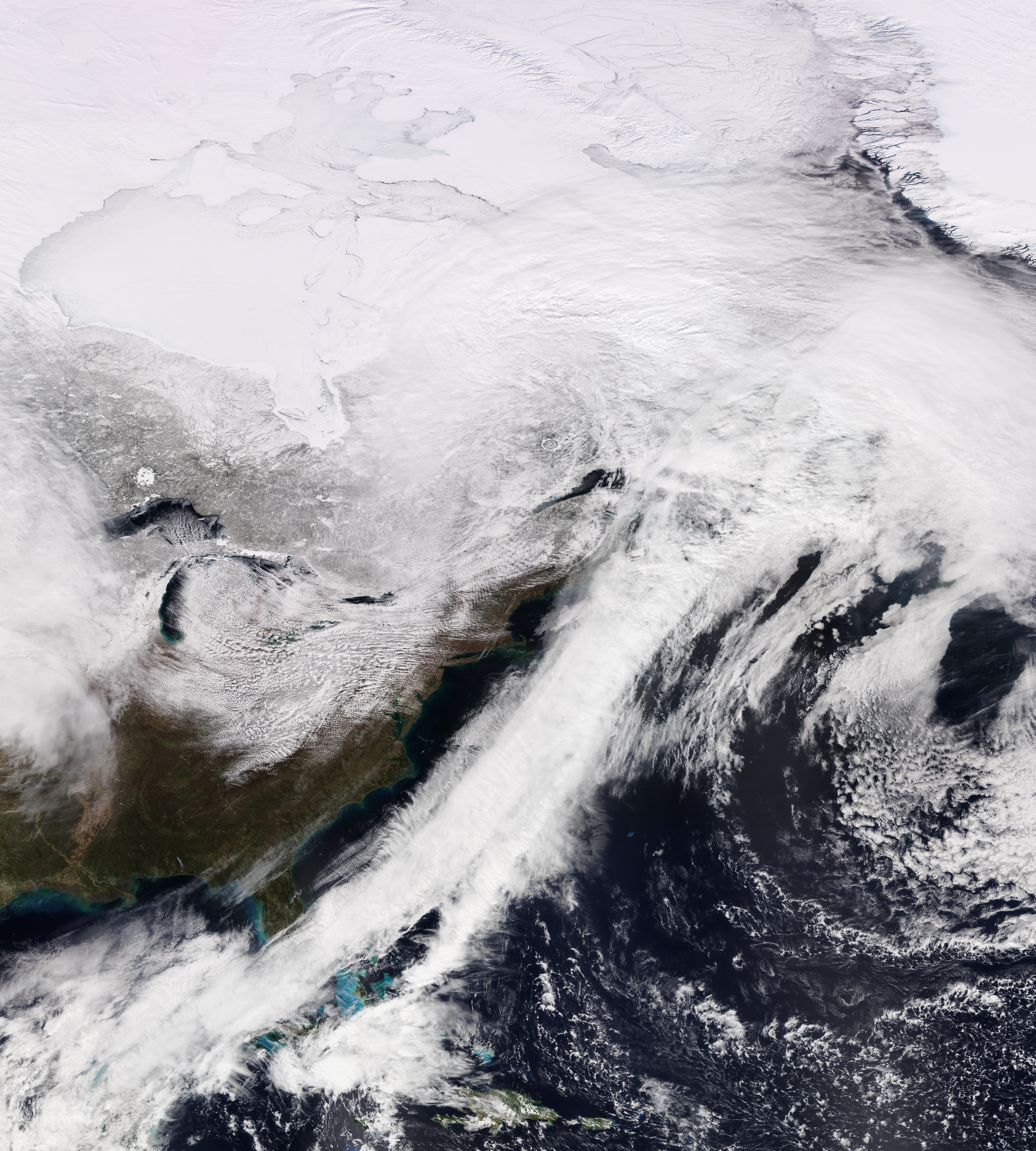
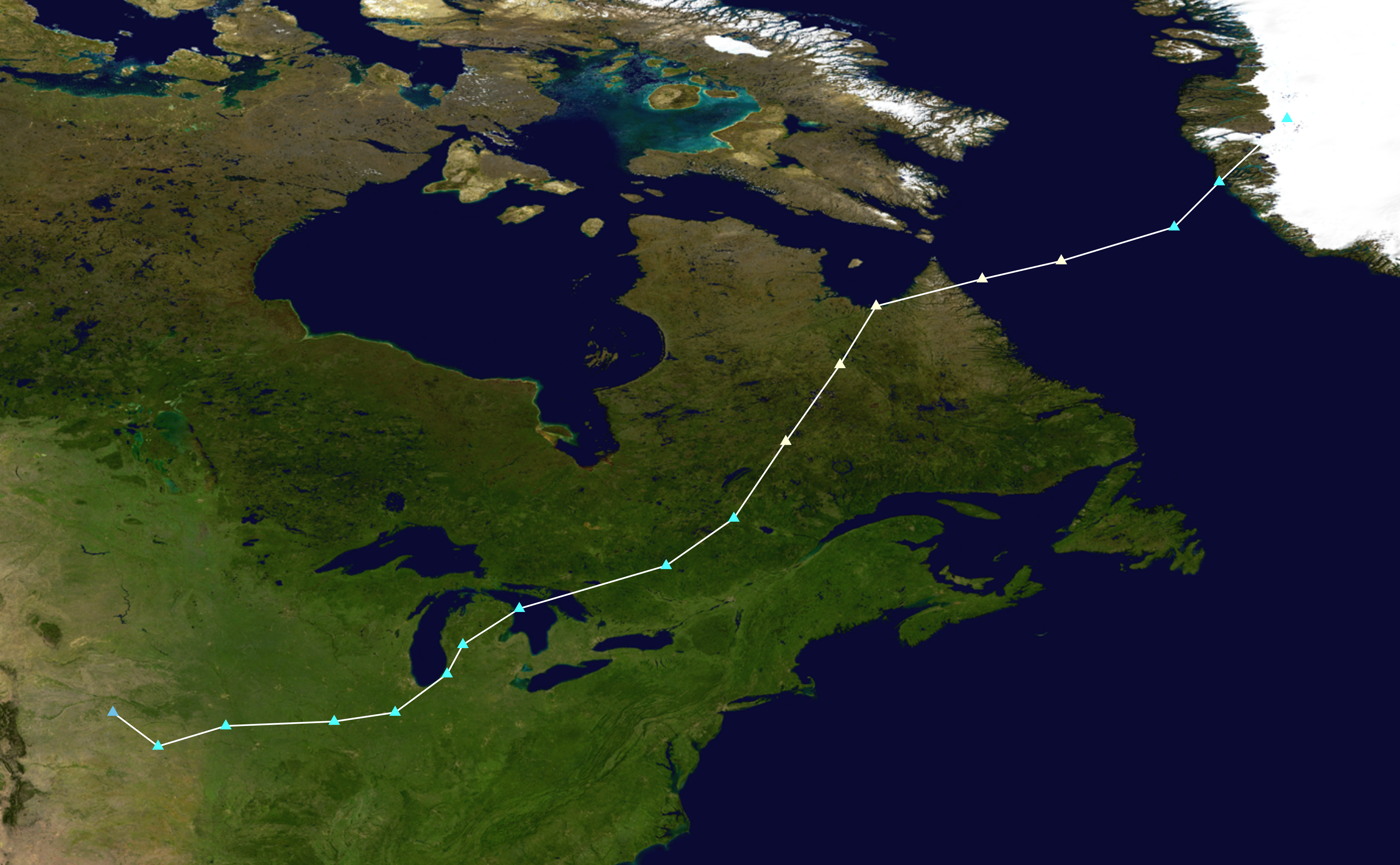
- Duration: March 13 – March 17, 2026
- Lowest pressure: 944 mb (27.88 inHg)
- Maximum snow: 52 in (130 cm)
- Fatalities: 3 fatalities
- Damage: $1.4 billion (2026 USD)

On March 11, an atmospheric river interacted with Arctic air from Canada, producing snowfall across the northern United States Rockies and the northern High Plains on March 13. The system moved inland on a general southeastwards to eastwards track over the next day, before it began to strengthen over Nebraska by 03:00 UTC on March 15, emerging from the Rocky Mountains as a Colorado low and turning northeastwards.

Widespread winter weather alerts, including winter storm warnings and blizzard warnings were issued from the state of Washington to Wisconsin and the Upper Peninsula of Michigan. Many governors primarily in the Upper Midwest issued states of emergencies as forecasts of 2–3 feet (24–36 in; 61–91 cm) were expected in the heaviest accumulations. Many flights were cancelled across the states of Minnesota and Wisconsin as well. Minnesota declared a peacetime emergency on March 13 in preparation for the storm. The following day on March 14, Wisconsin declared a state of emergency. Minnesota State Patrol reported over 100 crashes on March 14, with 21 involved an injury and one fatal.

Following the storm, the cold front brought Arctic air southwards across a large majority of the eastern half of the U.S. on March 17–18. The city of Montgomery, Alabama tied a daily record low on March 18, reaching 30 °F (−1 °C), tying the record set in 1941. Other locations also set daily record lows in the wake of the storm, including Mobile, Alabama at 32 °F (0 °C) on March 17 and Birmingham, Alabama at 27 °F (−3 °C).

=== Early April storm complexes ===
During the first week of April, two late season winter storms affected the Upper Midwest within a very short period, pushing areas there to one of their snowiest seasons on record. Additionally, both systems produced severe weather and flooding on the warm side.

==== First storm (April 1–3) ====
A low pressure system brought a cold front towards the United States West Coast on April 1, before quickly moving over the Southern Plains the following day. The low deepened to a pressure of 996 mbar (29.4 inHg) near the Kansas–Missouri–Nebraska tripoint by 15:00 UTC. The Weather Prediction Center started issuing storm summaries at 03:00 UTC on April 3 as the system began to occlude. Snowfall tapered off over the Upper Midwest as the system moved into central Canada later that day. The last storm summary was issued at 15:00 UTC.

Close to 12 in (30 cm) of snow fell on Mount Bachelor over a period of 24 hours. In Northern California, Liberty Utilities reported that high winds knocked down trees and power lines, damaging some of their equipment. A peak of around 15,000 customers lost power in South Lake Tahoe. On April 2, a fatal rollover crash occurred on I-43 between Denmark and Green Bay in Wisconsin amid icy conditions. Over 45,000 customers were without power in Wisconsin while at least 12,000 in the Upper Peninsula of Michigan early on April 3. Thief River Falls, Minnesota received 8 in (20 centimetres) of snowfall. Parts of Wisconsin reported 1 in (25 mm) of ice accumulations. In northern Ontario, heavy snow and some freezing rain in northeastern Ontario occurred on the night of April 2, prompting several sections of highways to closed across northeastern Ontario on the morning of April 3.

==== Second storm (April 3–5) ====
On April 3, a system developed over the central Rockies, producing heavy snowfall in the northern Rockies. The center of the low moved out into the northern Plains and over southern Iowa the following day. Storm summaries began to be issued by the Weather Prediction Center at 03:00 UTC. Across the Upper Midwest, a wintry mix and snow fell with the heaviest snow bands occurring over northern Minnesota. Further south ahead of a cold front extending to central Texas, there was a line of showers and storms. By 03:00 UTC on April 5, the low moved just north of the Upper Peninsula of Michigan. Wintry precipitation began to dwindle across the Midwest and Great Lakes as it continued northeastward. The system intensified into a robust mid-latitude cyclone as it moved into western Quebec. The Weather Prediction Center issued its last advisory at 15:00 UTC.

Over 2 ft (24 in; 61 cm) of snow fell in the Northern Rockies on April 3. By the following day on April 4, more than 1 ft (12 in; 30 cm) of snowfall occurred in portions of the Northern Plains, with the highest reported near Jamestown, North Dakota at 18 in (46 cm) of snow. Fargo set a daily snowfall record with 9.6 in (24 cm) of snow, beating a storm in 2023. I-94 westbound near Medina, North Dakota was closed by the North Dakota Highway Patrol due to vehicles blocking lanes. No travel advisories were in effect for large parts of eastern North Dakota in and around Fargo. 780 customers in Fargo were reported to have lost power by Xcel Energy. The Minnesota State Patrol responded to a number of accidents in west-central Minnesota. Spooner, Wisconsin reported 0.35 in (8.9 mm) in ice accumulations while Eagle River had 1 in (25 mm) of sleet. Significant damage to electrical infrastructure led to over 60,000 without power in Wisconsin. On April 5, up to 24,450 Hydro-Québec customers in Quebec were without power at 12:30 p.m. due to strong winds.

=== Early May winter storm ===
- Category 0 "Nuisance" (RSI/NOAA: N/A)
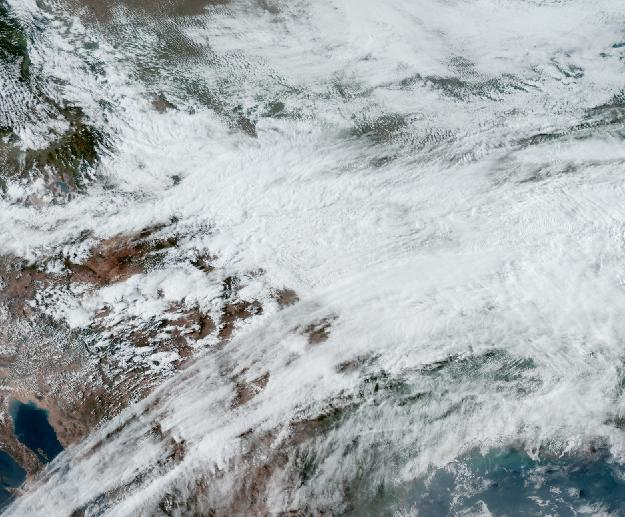
- Duration: May 5 – May 6, 2026
- Lowest pressure: 1009 mb (29.80 inHg)
- Maximum snow: 33.8 in (86 cm)

A significant late-season winter storm began impacting the Rocky Mountains on May 5, mainly within the states of Colorado and Wyoming. The storm developed as a result of a cold front that was pushing south across the region, causing orographic lifting against the Rockies and well-below normal temperatures regionally, leading to heavy wet snow falling across the Front Range. For most places, it was the heaviest snowfall during what was an otherwise below-average winter season; Cheyenne, Wyoming received 8.9 inches (23 cm) of snow, their heaviest of the season and the highest since March 2021, while the Boulder, Colorado office of the NWS recorded 10.7 inches (27 cm), the heaviest May snowstorm since 2013. Higher accumulations of 18–24 inches (46–61 cm) occurred in the mountainous peaks, with Estes Park reporting as much as 27 inches (69 cm).

A large portion of Interstate 80 in Wyoming was closed on the morning of May 6 as a result of the winter storm from Laramie to Cheyenne. As much as 55,000 residents in Colorado lost power, many of which resulted from falling trees as a consequence of the heavy wet nature of the snow. 500 delays were reported at the Denver International Airport, which received 5.5 inches (14 cm) of snow, while many schools and businesses closed on May 6.

== Records ==
=== United States ===
On November 11, 2025, Savannah, Georgia and Jacksonville, Florida both saw the coldest November morning since 1976, with temperatures in both cities dropping to 28 °F (−2 °C). Chicago broke a daily snowfall record for November 10, with 1.2 inches (3.0 cm) falling, breaking the previous daily record of 0.4 in (1.0 cm) in 1991. A record low temperature of −34 °F (−37 °C) was recorded in Watertown, New York on January 24, as well as the record cold daily high temperatures for January 24 in the New York Metropolitan Area. Cleveland, Ohio experienced the coldest daily high temperatures of 17 °F (−8 °C) or less for eight consecutive days from January 24 to January 31, tying with 1893 and 1899. Across the Southeast, many cities set daily low records on February 2. Jacksonville, Florida had a record-tying eight consecutive freezing mornings on February 3.

Several states in the Western United States, including California, Oregon, Washington, Arizona, New Mexico, Utah, Colorado and Wyoming, recorded their warmest December on record. However, Juneau, Alaska, recorded their coldest December on record. Juneau, Alaska also had the snowiest December on record at 209 centimetres (82 in) as well as a daily snowfall record for December with 41 centimetres (16 in) on December 30. Meanwhile, the state of Oklahoma recorded their driest December on record. Phoenix, Arizona had its warmest winter since records began. Snow cover on February 1 for the Western United States was the lowest in the satellite record which began in 2001. Also that day, Oregon, Colorado, and Utah had record low snowpack since widespread snowpack records became widespread in the early 1980s. On February 2, cities in the Western United States set daily high temperature records. Parts of southeast Alaska had record warm temperatures on February 3. The highest temperature recorded in the United States in March occurred in North Shore, California, on March 18, 108 °F (42 °C), tying a record from 1954. The winter overall gave the Colorado River Basin record low snowpack.

The winter of 2025–26 finished as the snowiest winter on record at Islip, New York and Providence, Rhode Island. February 2026 also became the snowiest month ever at Providence.

=== Canada ===
Temperatures rose above freezing in Grise Fiord, Nunavut on January 5, recording a record high of 5.5 °C (41.9 °F). Alert, Nunavut also set a monthly record of 1.8 °C (35.2 °F) on the morning of January 7. Thomsen River had a record three consecutive days of −50 °C (−58 °F) or below temperatures.

18 communities in Manitoba broke warm weather records on November 23, including Portage la Prairie at nearly 14 °C (57 °F). Three towns in Saskatchewan broke cold temperature records on January 22. By January 25, numerous towns in Saskatchewan broke cold weather records. From January 24–25, several towns in Manitoba broke cold temperature records. At least a dozen cities in British Columbia broke daily heat records on February 4.

Ottawa set a daily snowfall record on November 9. St. John's International Airport recorded 16.3 °C (61.3 °F) on January 16, becoming the warmest January temperature on record. On January 26, Toronto Pearson Airport set a new record for the snowiest day since records began in 1937, with 46 centimetres (18 in) of snow falling. It also broke the record for the snowiest January and snowiest month overall with a total of 88.2 centimetres (34.7 in) recorded in January 2026.

=== Elsewhere ===
The coldest daily high of 51 °F (11 °C) on The Bahamas was recorded in Freeport on February 1. On February 3, a weather station near Perico, Cuba recorded the first freezing temperatures ever recorded in the country, reaching 32 °F (0 °C). Flores, Guatemala had a record-tying low of 48 °F (9 °C) on February 1. A new February record of 38 °F (3 °C) was set at a Finca Los Andes mountain station in El Salvador.

The Danish Meteorological Institute in Nuuk recorded a preliminary average temperature of 0.2 °C (32.4 °F) during January, setting the warmest January on record.

== Season effects ==
This is a table of all of the events that have occurred in the 2025–26 North American winter. It includes their duration, damage, impacted locations, and death totals. Deaths in parentheses are additional and indirect (an example of an indirect death would be a traffic accident), but were still related to that storm. All of the damage figures are in 2025 USD.

Regional snowfall index scale
C0	C1	C2	C3	C4	C5

2025–26 North American winter season statistics
Event name	Dates active	RSI category	RSI value	Highest gust mph (km/h)	Minimum pressure (mbar)	Maximum snow in (cm)	Maximum ice in (mm)	Areas affected	Damage (2025 USD)	Deaths
Mid-October nor'easter	October 10–14	N/A	N/A	65 (105)	991	N/A	N/A	United States East Coast	$225 million	1
Ex-Halong	October 12–13	N/A	N/A	107 (172)	962	Unknown	N/A	Alaska	$125 million	1
Early November lake-effect snow & cold snap	November 9–11	N/A	N/S	58 (93)	Unknown	9–12 (23–30)	N/A	Great Lakes, Northeastern United States, Southeastern United States	Unknown	0
US Thanksgiving Week blizzard	November 24–27	N/A	N/A	78 (126)	991	33 (84)	N/A	Upper Midwest, Ontario, Northeastern United States	>$250 million	2
November 28–30 winter storm	November 28–30	Category 2	3.994	Unknown	1006	16.5 (42)	N/A	Midwestern United States, Northeastern United States, Ontario, Atlantic Canada	$335,000	1
December 1–3 winter storm	December 1–3	Category 1	1.073	53 (85)	972	17.3 (44)	0.40 (10)	Midwestern United States, Mid-Atlantic, Northeastern United States, Atlantic Canada	Unknown	2
December 13–15 winter storm	December 12–15	N/A	N/A	102 (164)	938	23.7 (60)	N/A	Northern Great Plains, Ohio Valley, Northeastern United States, New England, Atlantic Canada	Unknown	6
December 17–20 winter storm	December 17–20	N/A	N/A	144 (232)	945	12 (30)	N/A	Western United States, Central Plains, Southwestern United States, Texas, Eastern United States, western and eastern Canada	>$735 million	3
Late December Northern U.S. bomb cyclone	December 28–30	N/A	N/A	79 (127)	978	27 (69)	0.64 (16)	Midwest, Northeastern United States, Eastern Canada, Southern United States	$170 million	1
Late January winter storm	January 23–27	Category 3	6.739	93 (150)	958	31 (79)	1 (25)	Four Corners, Ohio Valley, Southern, Midwestern and Eastern United States, Central Canada, Atlantic Canada, Northern Mexico	>$4 billion	174
Pre-Groundhog Day nor'easter	January 30–February 2	Category 2	5.348	64 (103)	964	22.5 (57)	N/A	Southeastern United States, Massachusetts, Bermuda	$550 million	13
February West Coast atmospheric rivers	February 15–20	N/A	N/A	Unknown	Unknown	115 (290)	N/A	British Columbia, West Coast of the United States, High Plains, Upper Midwest	$200 million	14
Late February blizzard	February 20–24	Category 3	9.69	98 (158)	965	37.9 (96)	Unknown	Ohio Valley Northeastern United States Atlantic Canada	$500 million	30
Early March winter storm	March 10–14	N/A	N/A	123 (198)	985	11 (28)	Unknown	Western United States, Midwestern United States	$1.9 billion	1
Mid-March blizzard & cold snap	March 13–17	Category 5	26.967	69 (111)	944	52 (130)	0.33 (8.4)	Western United States, Midwestern United States	$1.4 billion	3
First storm (April 1–3)	April 1–3	N/A	N/A	Unknown	996	12 (30)	1 (25)	Western United States, Midwestern United States, Central Canada	$300 million	0
Second storm (April 3–5)	April 3–5	N/A	N/A	Unknown	Unknown	24 (61)	0.35 (8.9)	Northern Rockies, Midwestern United States	Unknown	0
Early May winter storm	May 5–6	N/A	N/A	Unknown	1009	33.8 (86)	N/A	Rocky Mountains	Unknown	0
Season aggregates
6 RSI storms	October 10 – April 5				938	115 (290)	1 (25)		≥ $11.3 billion (Note: Includes damages from events not listed in this table, including $650 million from the February 7–9 event and $300 million from a minor snowstorm and associated weather in the Mid-Atlantic on February 15–16.)	275

== See also ==
- 2025–26 European windstorm season
- Winter of 2025–26 in Great Britain and Ireland
- List of regional snowfall index category 5 winter storms
- Tornadoes of 2025
- Tornadoes of 2026
- Weather of 2025
- Weather of 2026

== Notes ==
Preceded by 2024-25	North American winters 2025-26	Succeeded by 2026-27
