= Arctic front =

Semi-permanent weather front

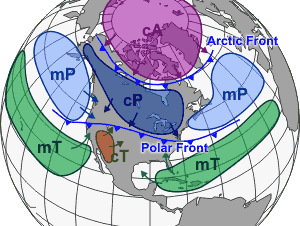
Different air masses which affect North America, as well as other continents, tend to be separated by frontal boundaries. In this illustration, the Arctic front separates Arctic from Polar air masses, while the Polar front separates Polar air from warm air masses. (cA is continental arctic; cP is continental polar; mP is maritime polar; cT is continental tropic; and mT is maritime tropic.)

The Arctic front is the semipermanent, semi-continuous weather front between the cold arctic air mass and the warmer air of the polar cell. It can also be defined as the southern boundary of the Arctic air mass. Mesoscale cyclones known as polar lows can form along the arctic front in the wake of extratropical cyclones. Arctic air masses in their wake are shallow with a deep layer of stable air above the shallow cold cool.

== Appearance in satellite images ==
Arctic Fronts form in the Arctic region, and move southwards in southerly flows. When they reach Northern Europe, they have usually travelled over an open sea, and convective cloudiness has developed. The appearance of an Arctic Cold Fronts is then, essentially, that of a shallow Cold Front.

Arctic Cold Fronts are usually so far north that Meteosat images alone are inadequate to recognize them. Also, the following conceptual models may look like Arctic Cold Fronts: polar Cold Front, Polar Low and Comma. The final check is best made using a loop of AVHRR images with the help of numerical model parameter fields.

== Types of Arctic cold fronts ==
Arctic Cold Fronts can be classified into two types:

- Baroclinic fronts

These fronts resemble polar cold fronts, but are usually not so extensive. The frontal cloudiness becomes more convective with time.

- Ice/sea boundary fronts

These fronts form over the ice/sea boundary and move southwards with the basic flow. There is only an isolated Cold Front. Often this type is so shallow and weak that it can not be detected in Meteosat water vapour images.

== See also ==
- Polar climate
