= North American blizzard of 2005 =

2005 winter storm

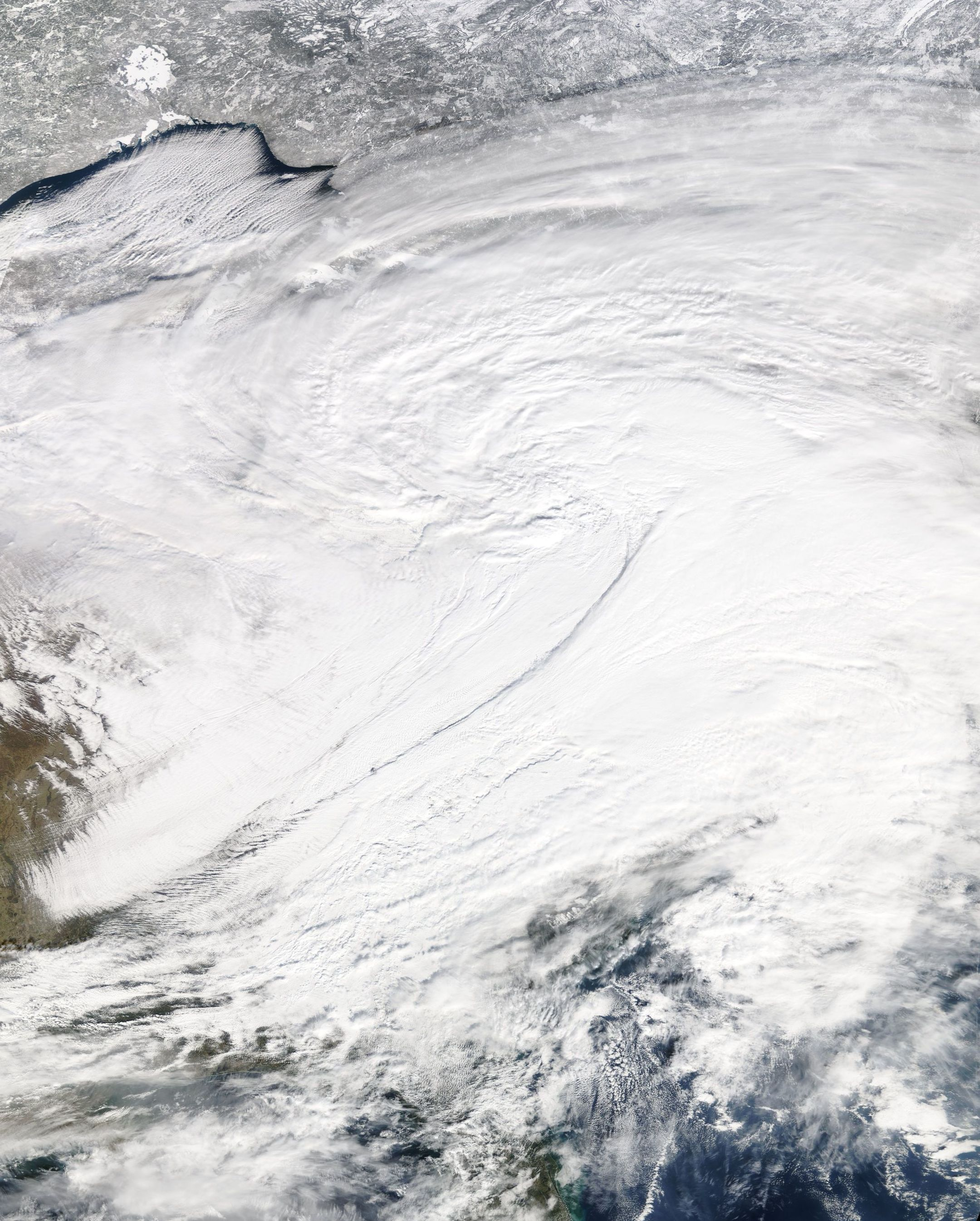
- Satellite image of the blizzard making its way across the Atlantic states.

Meteorological history
- Formed: January 20, 2005
- Dissipated: January 23, 2005

Category 4 "Crippling" blizzard
- Regional snowfall index: 10.34 (NOAA)
- Maximum snowfall or ice accretion: 33.0 in Plymouth and Salem, Massachusetts

Overall effects
- Fatalities: At least 12 (including 3 firefighters from NYC)
- Damage: Unknown
- Areas affected: Upper Midwest, Great Lakes Region, Northeastern United States, British Isles, Scandinavian Peninsula

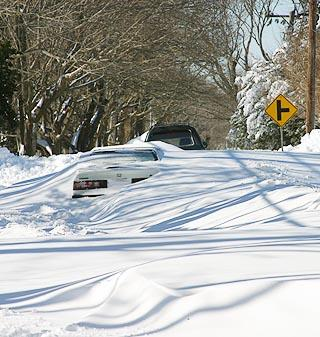
Abandoned cars line Route 6A in Yarmouth Port, Massachusetts, one of the harder hit areas, receiving as much as 30.5 inches (77.5 cm) of snow during the blizzard.

The North American blizzard of 2005 was a three-day storm that affected large areas of the northern United States, dropping more than 3 feet (0.9 m) of snow in parts of southeastern Massachusetts, as well as much of the Boston metropolitan area. While this was by far the hardest hit region, it was also a significant snowstorm for the Philadelphia and New York City areas, which both suffered occasional blizzard conditions and 12–15 in (30–38 cm) snow accumulations.

The storm began dropping snow on the upper Midwest on Thursday, January 20, 2005. It slowly moved eastward affecting the Great Lakes region and the Mid-Atlantic states on Friday and Saturday, January 21 and January 22, 2005. On Saturday evening the storm entered the Southern New England area. The strength of the storm, coupled with the extreme Arctic temperatures, created a light, fluffy snow which increased the snowfall totals.

The storm shut down Logan International Airport in Boston, Massachusetts and T. F. Green Airport in Rhode Island, while also impairing travel throughout much of Massachusetts due to the high amount of snow covering the roads. Practically all schools in the Metrowest and South East regions of Massachusetts were closed for at least two days. Cape Cod Community College, as well as all public schools on Cape Cod, Martha's Vineyard and Nantucket were closed for up to a week.

After traveling across the Atlantic Ocean, the storm system hit parts of Great Britain and Ireland and the Scandinavian peninsula, causing even more widespread blackouts and a small number of deaths in the region.

== Conditions ==
Conditions throughout much of eastern Massachusetts were near-whiteout and, in some cases, were whiteout. State Police in both Dartmouth and Middleborough suggested that residents travel as little as possible. Major highways, such as Route 24, Route 6 and Route 140, could not be properly cleared because of the heavy snowfall and high winds. Secondary highways, such as Route 79 were nearly impassable in some areas.

Many Boston-area newscasters credit the New England Patriots football game on January 23 for keeping most travellers indoors, avoiding the pile-ups and endless lines of stuck cars that were the hallmark of the Blizzard of 1978. The fact that the storm fell on a weekend when many people did not have to go to work or school also helped to this effect.

== Aftermath ==
With much of the snow cleared from the roads by the evening of January 24, snowpiles on street corners were in excess of ten feet high in some locations. Roads were severely narrowed in most congested areas, due to parked cars that were not towed and instead simply plowed in. Most schools in eastern Massachusetts and Rhode Island remained closed for an extended period of time to allow for clean-up of the road debris.

== Storm totals ==
=== Connecticut ===
County	Location	Storm total	Report date	Report time	Snow measurement	Notes
Litchfield	Lichfield	12.2 inches (31 cm)				
Hartford	Burlington	13.3 inches (34 cm)				
Hartford	East Granby	14.3 inches (36 cm)				
Hartford	South Windsor	11.5 inches (29 cm)	January 23	1:14 p.m.		
Hartford	Southington	12.8 inches (33 cm)	January 24	8:54 p.m.		Measurements from the general public
Hartford	Unionville	8.8 inches (22 cm)	January 23	1:30 p.m.		
Hartford	Windsor	11.0 inches (28 cm)	January 23	8:20 p.m.		
Hartford	Windsor Locks	12.5 inches (32 cm)	January 23	1:08 p.m.		Measurements from Bradley International Airport (BDL)
Tolland	Andover	7.0 inches (18 cm)	January 23	3:09 p.m.		
Tolland	Hebron	12.0 inches (30 cm)	January 23	1:20 p.m.		
Tolland	Stafford Springs	16.0 inches (41 cm)	January 23	2:23 p.m.		
Tolland	Storrs	7.0 inches (18 cm)	January 23	1:23 p.m.		
Windham	Ashford	9.0 inches (23 cm)	January 23	1:16 p.m.		
Windham	Eastford	8.0 inches (20 cm)	January 23	1:21 p.m.		
Windham	North Grosvenordale	14.0 inches (36 cm)	January 23	2:18 p.m.		
Windham	Plainfield	9.5 inches (24 cm)	January 23	1:22 p.m.		

=== Massachusetts ===
County	Location	Storm total	Report date	Report time	Snow measurement	Notes
Barnstable	Brewster	28.5 inches (72 cm)	January 23	8:20 p.m.		
Barnstable	Harwich Port	28.0 inches (71 cm)	January 23	10:49 p.m.		Measurements from the general public
Barnstable	Mashpee	30.5 inches (77 cm)	January 23	5:23 p.m.		
Barnstable	North Eastham	26.5 inches (67 cm)	January 23	5:28 p.m.		
Barnstable	Sagamore Beach	30.0 inches (76 cm)	January 23	9:44 p.m.		
Barnstable	Sandwich	24.0 inches (61 cm)	January 23	3:15 p.m.		Measurements from a NWS employee
Barnstable	Yarmouth Port	29.0 inches (74 cm)	January 23	2:40 p.m.		
Bristol	Acushnet	21.5 inches (55 cm)	January 23	3:04 p.m.		
Bristol	Easton	23.0 inches (58 cm)	January 23	1:07 p.m.		W.E. 1.71
Bristol	Fairhaven	25.5 inches (65 cm)		8:47 p.m.		
Bristol	New Bedford	26.0 inches (66 cm)			5 feet (1.5 m) drifts	
Bristol	Rehoboth	25.0 inches (64 cm)	January 23	2:47 p.m.		
Bristol	Seekonk	15.0 inches (38 cm)	January 23	4:30 p.m.	5 feet (1.5 m) drifts	
Bristol	Somerset	20.0 inches (51 cm)	January 23	3:03 p.m.		
Bristol	Taunton	18.0 inches (46 cm)	January 23	7:00 p.m.	5 feet (1.5 m) drifts	
Bristol	Taunton	26.0 inches (66 cm)	January 23	3:31 p.m.	5 feet (1.5 m) drifts	NWS Office KBOX
Dukes	Edgartown	24.0 inches (61 cm)	January 23	2:40 p.m.		
Essex	Beverly	26.0 inches (66 cm)	January 23	8:02 p.m.		Measurements from CO-Op observer
Essex	Haverhill	20.0 inches (51 cm)	January 23	9:59 p.m.	7 feet (2.1 m) drifts	
Essex	Ipswich	26.0 inches (66 cm)	January 23	3:10 p.m.		
Essex	Lawrence	23.0 inches (58 cm)	January 23	1:30 p.m.		
Essex	Lynn	24.0 inches (61 cm)	January 23	2:50 p.m.		
Essex	Manchester	26.5 inches (67 cm)	January 23	3:09 p.m.		
Essex	Marblehead	26.0 inches (66 cm)	January 23	9:41 p.m.		
Essex	Marblehead Neck	29.0 inches (74 cm)	January 23	2:34 p.m.		
Essex	Methuen	23.0 inches (58 cm)	January 23	2:04 p.m.		
Essex	North Andover	26.0 inches (66 cm)	January 23	1:00 p.m.	6 feet (1.8 m) drifts	
Essex	North Beverly	32.0 inches (81 cm)	January 23	8:25 p.m.		
Essex	Peabody	30.0 inches (76 cm)	January 23	1:55 p.m.		
Essex	Rowley	24.0 inches (61 cm)	January 23	2:56 p.m.		
Essex	Salem	27.0 inches (69 cm)	January 23	10:40 p.m.		Measurements from Salem State
Essex	Salem	33.0 inches (84 cm)	January 23	2:56 p.m.		Em
Essex	Saugus	30.0 inches (76 cm)	January 23	2:34 p.m.		
Essex	Swampscott	24.0 inches (61 cm)	January 23	3:53 p.m.		
Essex	Topsfield	30.0 inches (76 cm)	January 23	5:52 p.m.		
Essex	West Peabody	30.0 inches (76 cm)	January 23	3:53 p.m.		
Franklin	Ashfield	15.5 inches (39 cm)	January 23	3:38 p.m.		
Hampden	Chicopee	14.0 inches (36 cm)	January 23	11:56 p.m.		
Hampden	Granville	12.0 inches (30 cm)	January 23	2:15 p.m.		
Hampden	Southwick	10.0 inches (25 cm)	January 23	2:23 p.m.	0.84 inches (2.1 cm)	
Hampden	Wilbraham	11.0 inches (28 cm)	January 23	2:07 p.m.		
Hampshire	Amherst	10.0 inches (25 cm)	January 23	2:06 p.m.		
Hampshire	Belchertown	8.5 inches (22 cm)	January 23	2:05 p.m.		
Hampshire	Northampton	12.0 inches (30 cm)	January 23	2:32 p.m.		
Hampshire	South Hadley	11.0 inches (28 cm)	January 23	2:31 p.m.		
Hampshire	Southampton	12.5 inches (32 cm)	January 23	2:06 p.m.		
Middlesex	Ayer	20.3 inches (52 cm)	January 23	3:30 p.m.		
Middlesex	Belmont	26.0 inches (66 cm)	January 23	9:18 p.m.		
Middlesex	Billerica	27.5 inches (70 cm)	January 23	9:17 p.m.		
Middlesex	Cambridge	27.0 inches (69 cm)	January 23	2:58 p.m.		
Middlesex	Chelmsford	18.5 inches (47 cm)	January 23	2:19 p.m.		
Middlesex	Dracut	18.2 inches (46 cm)	January 23	2:20 p.m.		
Middlesex	Everett	26.5 inches (67 cm)	January 23	3:00 p.m.		
Middlesex	Hudson	13.5 inches (34 cm)	January 23	3:00 p.m.		
Middlesex	Lexington	21.0 inches (53 cm)	January 23	2:49 p.m.		
Middlesex	Littleton	19.0 inches (48 cm)	January 23	2:41 p.m.		
Middlesex	Malden	26.0 inches (66 cm)	January 23	2:30 p.m.		
Middlesex	North Billerica	25.0 inches (64 cm)	January 23	1:00 p.m.		
Middlesex	Pepperell	18.0 inches (46 cm)	January 23	2:49 p.m.		
Middlesex	Shirley	14.0 inches (36 cm)	January 23	1:05 p.m.		
Middlesex	South Chelmsford	27.0 inches (69 cm)	January 23	1:14 p.m.		
Middlesex	Stoneham	21.0 inches (53 cm)	January 23	1:23 p.m.		
Middlesex	Townsend	18.0 inches (46 cm)	January 23	4:02 p.m.		
Middlesex	Wayland	22.0 inches (56 cm)	January 23	3:40 p.m.		
Middlesex	Westford	22.0 inches (56 cm)	January 23	5:26 p.m.		
Middlesex	Wilmington	27.0 inches (69 cm)	January 23	1:37 p.m.		
Middlesex	Woburn	24.0 inches (61 cm)	January 23	10:40 p.m.		
Nantucket	Nantucket	24.0 inches (61 cm)	January 23	4:00 p.m.		
Norfolk	Braintree	28.3 inches (72 cm)	January 23	4:42 p.m.		
Norfolk	Canton	22.0 inches (56 cm)	January 23	2:59 p.m.		
Norfolk	Dedham	22.0 inches (56 cm)	January 23	4:00 p.m.		
Norfolk	Foxboro	25.1 inches (64 cm)	January 23	5:11 p.m.		
Norfolk	Franklin	23.0 inches (58 cm)	January 23	3:09 p.m.		
Norfolk	Millis	25.0 inches (64 cm)	January 23	4:00 p.m.		
Norfolk	Milton	27.0 inches (69 cm)	January 23	4:00 p.m.		
Norfolk	Needham	25.0 inches (64 cm)	January 23	9:21 p.m.		
Norfolk	North Attleboro	28.1 inches (71 cm)	January 23	7:37 p.m.		
Norfolk	Plainville	20.0 inches (51 cm)	January 23	2:48 p.m.		
Norfolk	Randolph	25.0 inches (64 cm)	January 23	8:19 p.m.		
Norfolk	Sharon	26.0 inches (66 cm)	January 23	4:30 p.m.		
Norfolk	South Weymouth	27.0 inches (69 cm)	January 23	9:18 p.m.		
Norfolk	Walpole	20.5 inches (52 cm)	January 23	2:40 p.m.		
Norfolk	Wellesley	17.2 inches (44 cm)	January 23	2:39 p.m.		
Norfolk	Weymouth	28.5 inches (72 cm)	January 23	2:44 p.m.		
Plymouth	Brockton	21.2 inches (54 cm)	January 23	5:20 p.m.		
Plymouth	Hanson	24.2 inches (61 cm)	January 23	3:11 p.m.		
Plymouth	Hingham	20.5 inches (52 cm)	January 23	5:07 p.m.		
Plymouth	Kingston	24.0 inches (61 cm)	January 23	9:41 p.m.		
Plymouth	Lakeville	30.0 inches (76 cm)	January 23	1:17 p.m.		
Plymouth	Manomet	28.0 inches (71 cm)	January 23	10:40 p.m.		
Plymouth	Marion	21.0 inches (53 cm)	January 23	8:35 p.m.		
Plymouth	Marshfield	25.0 inches (64 cm)	January 23	2:30 p.m.		
Plymouth	Plymouth	33.0 inches (84 cm)	January 23	7:02 p.m.		
Plymouth	Plympton	30.0 inches (76 cm)	January 23	10:41 p.m.		Measurement from the general public
Plymouth	Rockland	27.0 inches (69 cm)	January 23	8:03 p.m.		
Plymouth	Scituate	21.5 inches (55 cm)	January 23	4:01 p.m.		
Plymouth	Wareham	26.0 inches (66 cm)	January 23	3:09 p.m.		
Plymouth	West Duxbury	24.0 inches (61 cm)	January 23	2:43 p.m.		
Plymouth	Whitman	23.0 inches (58 cm)	January 23	3:02 p.m.		
Suffolk	Boston Common	26.0 inches (66 cm)	January 23	1:16 p.m.		Measurement from a NWS employee
Suffolk	East Boston	22.5 inches (57 cm)	January 23	7:00 p.m.		Measurement from Logan International Airport
Suffolk	Roslindale	25.5 inches (65 cm)	January 23	3:05 p.m.		
Suffolk	Winthrop	28.6 inches (73 cm)	January 23	4:00 p.m.		
Suffolk	Winthrop Square	27.0 inches (69 cm)	January 23	10:00 p.m.		
Worcester	Ashburnham	14.0 inches (36 cm)	January 23	9:17 p.m.		
Worcester	Athol	12.0 inches (30 cm)	January 23	2:33 p.m.		
Worcester	Boylston	18.1 inches (46 cm)	January 23	3:04 p.m.		
Worcester	Fitchburg	20.7 inches (53 cm)	January 23	2:10 p.m.		
Worcester	Gardner	22.0 inches (56 cm)	January 23	2:50 p.m.		
Worcester	Holden	19.0 inches (48 cm)	January 23	2:04 p.m.		
Worcester	Leicester	17.0 inches (43 cm)	January 23	1:33 p.m.	3 to 4 feet (0.91 to 1.22 m) drifts	
Worcester	Lunenburg	18.5 inches (47 cm)	January 23	2:02 p.m.		
Worcester	North Grafton	21.0 inches (53 cm)	January 23	1:04 p.m.		ret NWS orh oic
Worcester	Northborough	26.0 inches (66 cm)	January 23	3:19 p.m.		
Worcester	Old Sturbridge	18.0 inches (46 cm)	January 23	2:03 p.m.		
Worcester	Oxford	15.0 inches (38 cm)	January 23	2:07 p.m.		
Worcester	Shrewsbury	23.0 inches (58 cm)	January 23	3:25 p.m.		
Worcester	Southborough	22.0 inches (56 cm)	January 23	3:11 p.m.		
Worcester	Spencer	18.0 inches (46 cm)	January 23	2:05 p.m.		
Worcester	Uxbridge	26.0 inches (66 cm)	January 23	1:29 p.m.		
Worcester	Webster	23.0 inches (58 cm)	January 23	2:02 p.m.		
Worcester	West Brookfield	15.0 inches (38 cm)	January 23	2:30 p.m.		
Worcester	West Warren	12.5 inches (32 cm)	January 23	3:14 p.m.		

=== New Hampshire ===
County	Location	Storm total	Report date	Report time	Snow measurement	Notes
Cheshire	Alstead	12.5 inches (32 cm)	January 23	1:03 p.m.		
Cheshire	Dublin	18.5 inches (47 cm)	January 23	1:21 p.m.		
Hillsborough	Greenville	16.5 inches (42 cm)	January 23	2:20 p.m.		
Hillsborough	Hollis	19.0 inches (48 cm)	January 23	3:45 p.m.		
Hillsborough	Hudson	15.6 inches (40 cm)	January 23	1:36 p.m.		
Hillsborough	Nashua	18.5 inches (47 cm)	January 23	4:00 p.m.		
Hillsborough	New Ipswich	17.5 inches (44 cm)	January 23	1:35 p.m.		
Hillsborough	South Weare	12.5 inches (32 cm)	January 23	4:29 p.m.		
Rockingham	Atkinson	26.8 inches (68 cm)	January 23	7:00 a.m.		
Rockingham	Plaistow	24.0 inches (61 cm)	January 23	12:35 p.m.		

=== New York ===
County	Location	Storm total	Report date	Report time	Snow measurement	Notes
Ulster	Kingston	12.2 inches (31 cm)				

=== Pennsylvania ===
County	Location	Storm total	Report date	Report time	Snow measurement	Notes
Berks	Morgantown	10.0 inches (25 cm)				
Bucks	Langhorne	13.0 inches (33 cm)				
Bucks	Perkasie	12.0 inches (30 cm)				
Bucks	Yardley	15.8 inches (40 cm)				
Carbon	Albrightsville	13.0 inches (33 cm)				
Carbon	Lehighton	11.5 inches (29 cm)				
Chester	Honey Brook	8.0 inches (20 cm)				
Chester	Phoenixville	11.8 inches (30 cm)				
Delaware	Boothwyn	11.0 inches (28 cm)				
Delaware	Radnor	13.6 inches (35 cm)				
Lehigh	Germansville	10.2 inches (26 cm)				
Lehigh	Lehigh Valley International Airport	10.6 inches (27 cm)				
Monroe	Pocono Summit	10.0 inches (25 cm)				
Monroe	Saylorsburg	11.0 inches (28 cm)				
Montgomery	Conshohocken	13.5 inches (34 cm)				
Montgomery	Green Lane	11.0 inches (28 cm)				
Montgomery	Palm	11.0 inches (28 cm)				
Northampton	Easton	12.0 inches (30 cm)				
Northampton	Forks Township	14.9 inches (38 cm)				
Philadelphia	Northeast Philadelphia	13.4 inches (34 cm)				
Philadelphia	Philadelphia International Airport	12.6 inches (32 cm)				

=== Rhode Island ===
County	Location	Storm total	Report date	Report time	Snow measurement	Notes
Bristol	Bristol	21 inches (53 cm)	January 23	5:02 p.m.		
Kent	Warwick	23.4 inches (59 cm)	January 23	1:02 p.m.		TF Green (Pvd)
Kent	Warwick	20.9 inches (53 cm)	January 23	3:16 p.m.		
Kent	West Warwick	24.5 inches (62 cm)	January 23	2:51 p.m.		
Providence	Cranston	21.0 inches (53 cm)	January 23	2:53 p.m.		
Providence	Greenville	21.5 inches (55 cm)	January 23	1:13 p.m.		
Providence	Johnston Memorial	22.5 inches (57 cm)	January 23	4:03 p.m.		Measurement from a NWS employee
Providence	North Cumberland	27.0 inches (69 cm)	January 23	7:45 p.m.		
Providence	Pawtucket	16.0 inches (41 cm)	January 23	2:10 p.m.		
Providence	Rumford	19.0 inches (48 cm)	January 23	10:46 p.m.		
Providence	Woonsocket Reservoir	18.9 inches (48 cm)	January 23	1:55 p.m.	1.36 inches (3.5 cm)	
Rhode Island	Hopkinton	21.0 inches (53 cm)	January 23	2:36 p.m.		
Rhode Island	North Kingstown	17.0 inches (43 cm)	January 23	1:02 p.m.		
Rhode Island	Westerly	20.0 inches (51 cm)	January 23	5:35 p.m.	5 feet (1.5 m) drifts	

== See also ==
- List of Regional Snowfall Index Category 4 winter storms
