= 2005 United Kingdom snow events =

The year 2005 saw 25 heavy snowfall days, which is the joint snowiest year with 1876 across the United Kingdom, between the years 1861–2005.

== January ==
The first event occurred on the weekend of Saturday 1st and Sunday 2 January. Belts of rain sweeping west to east across the UK turned to snow on the leading edge over parts of Scotland and Northern England, particularly the Scottish Highlands on the 2nd. The snow caused some travel disruption with some roads being forced to close. The snow was accompanied by gale-force winds, peaking at 70 mph (110 km/h) during the period.

Snow showers continued to affect Highland Scotland on Wednesday 12 January, with blizzards caused by 100 mph (160 km/h) winds. Snow showers also affected parts of Southern Scotland, Northeast England and the Midlands.

After a brief spell of settled weather, a series of Atlantic depressions affected all of the United Kingdom on Monday 17th and Tuesday 18 January. Rainbands pushed eastwards across the country, turning to snow across Scotland, and also Northern Ireland and Northern England on the 18th. All of the schools on the Western Isles were closed on the 18th as up to 25 cm (9 inches) of snow fell in central and eastern regions of Scotland. Several roads were forced to close.

As an anticyclone dominated the weather between Sunday 23rd and Thursday 27th, cold northerly winds plagued eastern coasts of both Scotland and England. Frequent heavy snow showers affect Eastern and Northern Scotland, Eastern England and also Central Southern England. County Durham received 29 cm (11.5 inches) of lying snow on the 23rd, whilst 4 cm (1.5 inches) was reported in Dover and Folkestone, Kent, on the 25th and some minor snowfalls also affected the Midlands and the higher ground of South West England.

== February ==
After a relatively mild but unsettled first half of February, Arctic air flooded southwards behind a cold front on the 18th. Snow showers affected the Midlands, Northern England, Southeast England and Northern Scotland between Sunday 20th and Monday 28th. North Yorkshire received 8 cm (3 inches) of lying snow on the 21st, whilst blizzards and 13 cm (5 inches) of lying snow forced more than 30 schools to close in Aberdeenshire. Temperatures also struggled to climb above freezing, with Buxton, Derbyshire, only reaching 0.8 °C (33.4 °F) as a maximum temperature on the 22nd. By the 25th, 30 cm (12 inches) of snow lay over the Pennines, with drifts of 1.5 metres (5 feet) reported, 50 cm (19 inches) of snow lay in County Durham and 7 cm (about 3 inches) in the Dover area of Kent.

The cold, arctic weather continued right to the end of February, with further frequent snow showers in eastern regions. 54 flights were cancelled from Heathrow and hundreds of schools across the southeast were forced to shut as 27 cm (11 inches) of snow fell across Kent.

50 cm (19 inch) snow drifts were reported in Kent and East Sussex on the 27th, causing several road accidents.

== March ==
Snow continued to fall across Scotland and Eastern England into March, with 30 vehicles involved in an accident on the M8 between Glasgow and Edinburgh, on the 1st. The snow caused more than 140 schools in Fife and 30 schools in Aberdeenshire to close or partially close, along with 20 schools and nurseries in Angus.

The heaviest March snowfall for 10 years occurred across Kent on the 2nd. 30 cm (12 inch) drifts on the North Downs caused the closure of 400+ schools and the M2 and Operation Stack was implemented on the M20 motorway. 200 homes also lost their electricity supply in Kent, Surrey and East Sussex. Snow continued to fall in these regions on the 3rd and 4th, temporarily closing Luton and Stansted airports. Meanwhile, further snow affected Northeast Scotland and Northeast England, with significant accumulations reported and hundreds of school closures.

However, milder weather made a return across the UK, however as showers pushed eastwards they turned to snow across Northern Scotland during the night of the 13th and 14 March. March continued and ended on a relatively mild but unsettled note.

== April ==
Typically, a showery start to April was replaced with a return to cold, northerly winds as a weak cold front passed eastwards on 7 and 8 April. This brought a period of heavy snow to the Scottish Highlands, blocking many high level routes in the area.

Showers also turned briefly to snow as far south as the Derbyshire Peaks on the night of the 15th. This was the last snow event of the season.

== November ==
As two cold fronts pushed eastwards on the 24th, squally showers turned to sleet and snow across East Anglia, Wales and Southwest England. Up to 30 cm (12 in) of snow was reported in Devon and Cornwall on the 25th, with 2-metre (6 ft 7 in) drifts. The snowfall trapped approximately 1,000 people on the A30 near Kennards House, across Bodmin Moor, Cornwall, after several snow related accidents blocked the road. The snow caused a 6-mile (10 km) tailback and people were advised by the police to remain in their vehicles. A Royal Marine and two RAF and Navy helicopters, and a convoy of four-wheel drive vehicles, organised by Devon and Cornwall police, took stranded drivers to leisure centres and emergency shelters for the night. 68 schools across Cornwall were forced to close because of the bad weather.

Blizzards also affected Northern Scotland and Northern Ireland, where four men were stranded on the Cairngorms. Heavy snow showers continued to fall over the Grampians and the Highlands on the 28th, and snow showers also reported in Manchester, over the Pennines and North York Moors. These also pushed southwards into the Midlands and Lincolnshire during the afternoon, before affecting Gloucestershire during the evening, especially between 17:00–20:00 GMT. Approximately 400 cars were abandoned on the A417 between Gloucester and Cirencester due to snowy conditions, and the A57 Snake Pass in the Peak District was closed for a time.

== December ==
A brief northerly blast mid-month brought frequent hail and snow showers down the east coast, where a covering of snow was reported in Norfolk on the 17th.

Then, after a quiet and relatively settled Christmas period, showers over Essex and Kent turned increasingly wintry on Boxing Day night as cold air arrived from the east. Here the snow settled, and frequent snow showers in Southeast England and East Anglia on 27 and 28 December gave a covering of 30 cm (12 in) across the Downs in Kent, causing some roads and the Channel Tunnel terminal to close for two hours. By the 28th, the snow showers began to affect other northern regions, including Norfolk, Lincolnshire, West Yorkshire and Northeast England. North Yorkshire received 20 cm (8 in) of snow over high ground, whilst the snow caused huge tailbacks on the A1 between Alnwick and Berwick. Folkestone, in Kent, also had a report of 25 centimetres (9.8 in) of snow on the ground on the 28th. The snow showers petered later on the 29th as outbreaks of rain, sleet and hill snow moved into western areas.

On Friday 30 December, a band of heavy rain pushed eastwards, with heavy snow on the leading edge. This brought several hours of snow followed by rain, where 20 cm (8 in) fell in some parts of Yorkshire, with snowdrifts of 1 m (3 ft 3 in) reported. The snow caused hundreds of drivers to be stranded on the A1079 during the late morning at Arras Hill in the East Riding of Yorkshire. There was a marked temperature difference on the 30th, with Redesdale, Northumberland, only reaching 0.4 °C (32.7 °F) as a maximum, whilst some places reached 12 °C (54 °F) in Southwest England.
