= Blizzard of 1978 =

Blizzard of 1978 may refer to:

- Great Blizzard of 1978, a historic winter storm that struck the Ohio Valley and Great Lakes regions of the United States and Southern Ontario in Canada from Wednesday, January 25 through Friday, January 27, 1978
- Northeastern United States blizzard of 1978, a catastrophic, historic nor'easter that struck New England, New Jersey, and the New York metropolitan area
