= White Hurricane =

White Hurricane can refer to these weather events:

- Great Blizzard of 1888, a powerful blizzard that affected the Northeast United States
- Great Lakes Storm of 1913, a blizzard that affected the Great Lakes region of the U.S. and Canada
- Great Blizzard of 1978, a blizzard that affected the Great Lakes region of the U.S. and Canada
- Storm of the Century (1993), a large storm system that affected the eastern third of the North America
