= Great Appalachian Storm of 1950 =

1950 extratropical cyclone in the Eastern United States

Great Appalachian Storm of November 1950
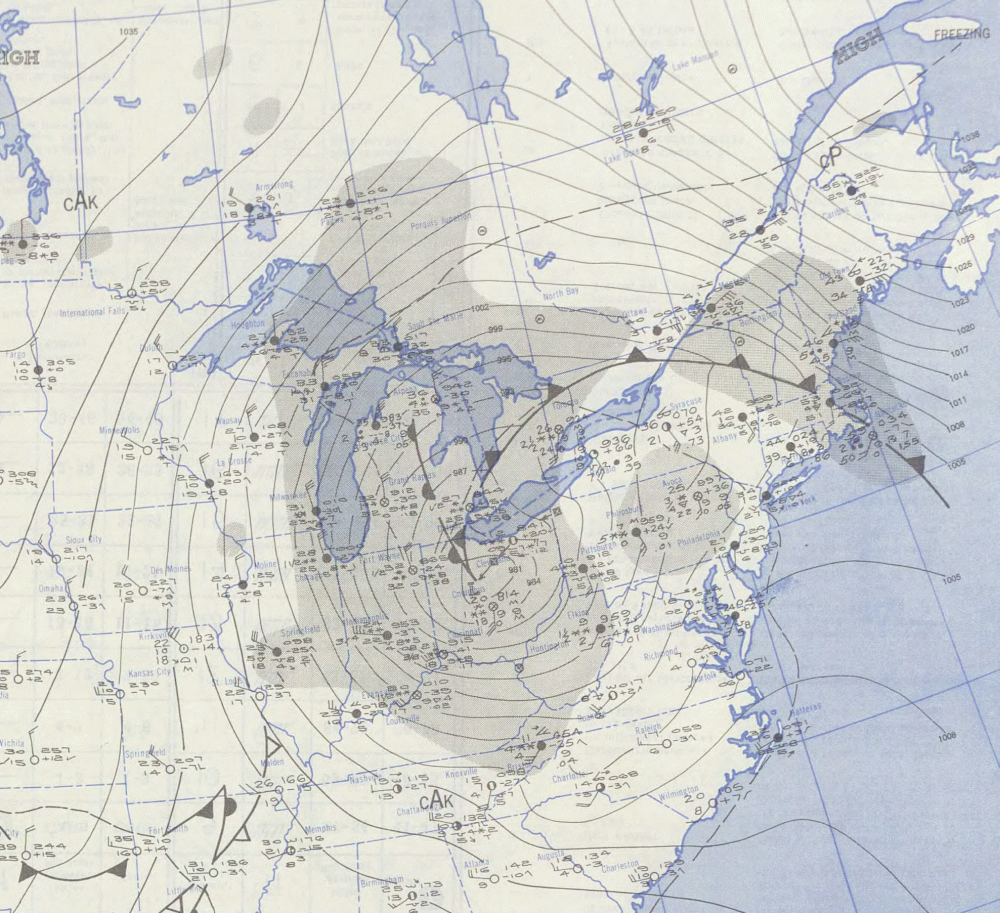
- Surface analysis showing cyclone near time of maximum intensity on November 25, 1950

Meteorological history
- Formed: November 24, 1950
- Dissipated: November 30, 1950

Category 5 "Extreme" blizzard
- Regional snowfall index: 34.69 (NOAA)
- Lowest pressure: 978 mbar (hPa); 28.88 inHg
- Max. snowfall: 57 inches (140 cm)

Overall effects
- Fatalities: 383
- Damage: $66.7 million (1950 dollars)
- Areas affected: Eastern United States; Southeast Canada

The Great Appalachian Storm of 1950 was a large extratropical cyclone which moved through the Eastern United States from November 24–30, 1950, causing blizzard conditions along the western slopes of the Appalachian Mountains and significant winds and heavy rainfall east of the mountains. Hurricane-force winds, peaking at 110 miles per hour (180 km/h) in Concord, New Hampshire, and 160 mph (260 km/h) in the highlands of New England, disrupted power to 1 million customers during the event.

In all, the storm impacted 22 states, killing 383 people, injuring over 160, and causing $66.7 million in damage (equivalent to $707 million in 2025). U.S. insurance companies paid out more money to their policyholders for damage resulting from the cyclone than for any previous storm. The cyclone is also one of only twenty-six storms to rank as a Category 5 on the regional snowfall index. It was termed in certain sources the "Storm of the Century".

== Meteorological history ==
The preceding atmospheric state was one of La Niña conditions, the cold phase of the El Niño–Southern Oscillation, which favors a storm track from the Ohio and Tennessee Valleys into the Appalachian Mountains. The cyclone initially formed in southeastern North Carolina near a cold front on the morning of November 24 as the main cyclone over the Great Lakes weakened. Rapid development ensued as the surface center began to migrate back into a closed 500 hPa-level (14.75 inHg) (around 6,000 m/20,000 ft above sea level) cyclone, and the cyclone bombed while moving north through Washington D.C. the next morning. The former occluded front to its northwest became a warm front which moved back to the west around the strengthening, and now dominant, southern low-pressure center. By the evening of November 25, the cyclone retrograded, or moved northwestward, into Ohio due to a blocking ridge across eastern Canada. It was at this time that the pressure gradient was at its most intense across southern New England and eastern New York. A wide area of 850 mb (hPa) winds occurred. The cyclone moved west over Lake Erie to the north of the upper cyclone before looping over Ohio as the low-level and mid-level cyclone centers coupled. Significant convection within its comma head led to the development of a warm seclusion, or a pocket of low-level warm air, near its center, which aided in further development due to the increased lapse rates a warmer low-level environment affords under a cold low. After the system became stacked with height, the storm slowly spun down as it drifted north and northeast into eastern Canada over the succeeding few days.

== Effects in the United States ==
This extratropical cyclone rapidly deepened as it moved up the eastern side of the Appalachians during November 24 and 25 and continued into November 27. Coastal flooding was seen along the U.S. coastline from New Jersey northward.

=== Southeast ===
In Alabama, all-time record lows for November were set at Birmingham 5 °F (−15 °C), Mobile 22 °F (−6 °C), and Montgomery 13 °F (−11 °C). Across Florida, all-time record lows for November were set at Apalachicola (24 °F (−4 °C)), Pensacola (22 °F (−6 °C)), and Jacksonville (23 °F (−5 °C)). In Georgia, all-time record lows for November were set at Atlanta (3 °F (−16 °C)), Columbus (10 °F (−12 °C)), Augusta (11 °F (−12 °C)), and Savannah (15 °F (−9 °C). In South Carolina, all-time record lows for November were set at Charleston (17 °F (−8 °C)) and Greenville (11 °F (−12 °C)). In North Carolina, all-time record lows for November were set at Asheville 1 °F (−17 °C) and Wilmington 16 °F (−9 °C). In Tennessee, all-time record lows for November were set at Chattanooga (4 °F (−16 °C)),Knoxville (5 °F (−15 °C)), Memphis (9 °F (−13 °C)), and Nashville (−1 °F (−18 °C)). In Kentucky, an all-time record low for November was set at Louisville (−1 °F (−18 °C)).

=== New Hampshire ===
Concord recorded a wind gust of 110 miles per hour (180 km/h) during the height of the storm. Winds at Mount Washington reached 160 miles per hour (260 km/h).

=== New York ===
Sustained winds of 50–60 mph (80–100 km/h) with gusts to 83 miles per hour (134 km/h) were recorded at Albany, New York. A wind gust of 94 miles per hour (151 km/h) was recorded in New York City. Extensive damage was caused by the wind across New York, including massive tree fall and power outages. Coastal flooding breached dikes at LaGuardia Airport, flooding the runways. Flooding extended to New York City's Office of Emergency Management on the Lower East Side, in Manhattan.

=== Connecticut ===
Extensive wind damage with tidal flooding occurred along the coast in Connecticut. On the coast structures and railroad tracks washed away. Plows were needed to remove sand from coastal roads. Roofs were torn off on the coast and at the University of Connecticut. The tide at New London was 7.58 ft (2.31 m), the third highest recorded in the last 100 years. Hartford had sustained winds of 70 mph (110 km/h), the highest ever on record, with 100 mph (160 km/h) gusts, also the highest on record, recorded on three separate occasions. The 62 mph (100 km/h) sustained wind recorded at Bridgeport is the fourth highest on record. Other gusts included 88 mph (142 km/h) at Bridgeport and 77 mph (124 km/h) at New Haven.

=== New Jersey ===
A wind gust of 108 mph (174 km/h), the strongest ever recorded in New Jersey, occurred in Newark.

=== Ohio ===
On the storm's west side, nearly a foot (30 cm) of snow fell on Dayton, Ohio, which combined with the wind and cold temperatures to constitute their worst blizzard on record. Nearly the entire state was blanketed with 10 inches (25 cm) of snow, with 20–30 in (50–80 cm) being measured in eastern sections of Ohio. The highest report was 44 inches (110 cm) from Steubenville. Snow drifts were up to 25 feet (7.6 m) deep. Winds exceeded 40 miles per hour (64 km/h) with gusts as high as 60 miles per hour (100 km/h). Bulldozers were used to clear roads. Despite the high winds and snow, the annual football game between the University of Michigan and Ohio State University went on as scheduled in Columbus and was nicknamed the Snow Bowl. When the snow melted during the first four days of December, river flooding occurred in Cincinnati.

=== Pennsylvania ===
During the height of the storm, record to near-record flooding occurred along the eastern side of the Appalachians across eastern and central sections of the state. The Schuylkill at Fairmount Dam reached its highest stage since 1902. In Pittsburgh, 30.5 inches (77 cm) of snow accumulated from this cyclone. Tanks were used to clear the resultant snow. When a warm spell visited the region during the first four days of December, river flooding struck Pittsburgh.

=== West Virginia ===
Parkersburg recorded 34.4 inches (87 cm) of snowfall during the passage of this low, which exceeded its snowiest November on record by over 5 inches (13 cm). Pickens reported the highest amount from anywhere within the cyclone, with 57 inches (140 cm) measured. November 1950 became West Virginia's snowiest month on record. This remarkably heavy snow led to 160 deaths.

== Effects in Canada ==
=== Ontario ===
This system also generated a major snowstorm for parts of eastern Canada, with 12 inches (30 cm) of snowfall recorded in Toronto on November 24. This set a record for single-day snowfall in November.

== Lasting impact ==
This cyclone was used as a test case for some of the first attempts at numerical modeling of the atmosphere, and is still used as a case study to run recent versions of forecast models. These studies helped create what is now known as the National Centers for Environmental Prediction (NCEP), a division of the National Weather Service.

== Other similar storms ==
Storms during the time frames November 8–10, 1913, October 22–25, 1923, and November 19–22, 1952 have been considered analogous to this cyclone. Despite their similarities, there are some differences. For example, the 1913 event was much more destructive to Great Lakes shipping, while the 1950 storm caused greater snowfall amounts.

== See also ==
- Cyclogenesis
- Extratropical cyclone
- Great Lakes Storm of 1913
- Great Snowstorm of 1944
