= Great Snowstorm of 1944 =

North American winter storm

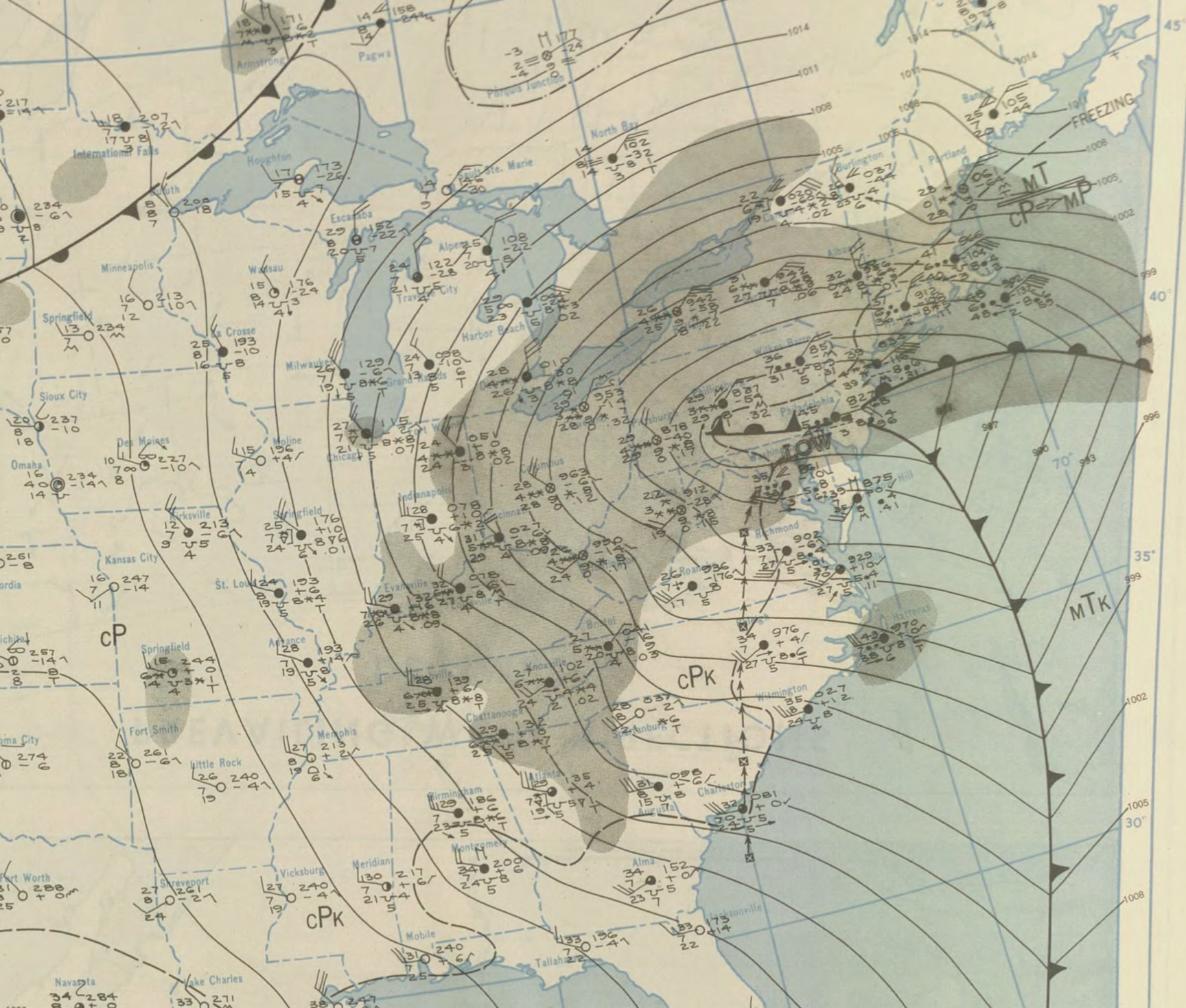
- Surface weather analysis showing the storm over the Mid-Atlantic region on December 12

Meteorological history
- Formed: December 10, 1944
- Dissipated: December 13, 1944

Category 3 "Major" winter storm
- Regional snowfall index: 9.50 (NOAA)
- Max. snowfall: 36.0 inches (91 cm) - recorded at Elkins, Randolph County, in West Virginia

Overall effects
- Fatalities: 87-100 in United States and 21-24 in Canada
- Areas affected: Eastern Great Lake States and Provinces of North America

The Great Snowstorm of 1944 (Note: Numerous sources in various geographic areas, both in 1944-45 and in the 21st century have referred to the storm as the Great Snowstorm—see attached sources (note: last reference refers to December of 1944 as part of Winter of 1945).) was a disruptive winter storm that brought high winds and between 12 and 30 inches (30 and 76 centimetres) of snow to the eastern Great Lakes region of North America between Sunday, December 10, and Wednesday, December 13, 1944. The areas most affected included northeastern Ohio, western Pennsylvania, West Virginia, upstate New York, southern Ontario and southern Quebec.

The snowstorm was caused when two separate storms, one from the west, which had dropped moderate amounts of snow through the Central Great Plains and Midwest of the United States, and another from the southern Atlantic Coast, both moved towards Pennsylvania, causing high snowfall amounts and high winds in the adjacent states and provinces, before both moved easterly through New England and then into the Atlantic Ocean. Other effects of the twin-pronged storm, such as cold temperatures, high winds, light snow, sleet, freezing rain and rain, covered the remainder of the eastern United States and southern central Canada.

Including the toll from the western storm, the death toll was between 87 and 100 people in the US and between 21 and 24 people in Canada, with an unknown total of serious injuries. The most heavily impacted major cities included: Toronto with 57.2 cm (22.5 in) of snow; Hamilton, Ontario, with 62.5 cm (24.6 in); Pittsburgh with 15.5 inches (39 cm); and Rochester with 22.3 inches (57 cm); while smaller cities with the greatest snowfalls included St. Catharines, Ontario, with 66 cm (26 in) and Erie, Pennsylvania, with 26.5 inches (67 cm).

The storm was crippling to these urban areas such that most car, truck, streetcar and bus transport was blocked for a full day and hindered for three to five days, while stores, government offices and factories were closed for one to two days, and schools were closed for two to three days or longer. In some rural areas nearby these cities, people were snowbound to varying degrees for up to five or six days. Intercity travel by road, bus or air was blocked for two to three days and train travel was blocked or subject to long delays for one to two days. The single highest snowfall was recorded in Elkins in Randolf County, West Virginia, which received 36 inches (91 cm), with other mountainous areas of that state receiving about 30 inches (76 cm).

== Meteorological history ==
One low pressure system/storm had formed late on December 8 in the southern High Plains and, drawing in cold air from the north, slowly moved northeastward producing snowfall over a large area, including as far south as the northern portions of some Gulf States. States receiving substantial snowfalls included Colorado, Kansas, Nebraska, Missouri, Iowa, Illinois, southern Wisconsin, Kentucky, Indiana and southern Michigan. A smaller low pressure system/storm, containing warm moist air, formed along the southern Atlantic Coast late on December 10 and unexpectedly moved northward towards Pennsylvania on December 11, slowing down the storm from the west and bringing additional moisture, thereby increasing snowfall amounts in the adjacent states and provinces in the eastern Great Lakes Region plus southward along the spine of the Appalachian Mountains.

Cities such as Pittsburgh and Toronto were expecting four or five inches of snow but instead received four to five times that amount, leading Pittsburghers to call it the "sneak" snowstorm. Winds whipped snow into drifts and impeded traffic considerably over much of the affected areas. On December 12, the storms moved northeasterly to northern Maine leaving snow across much of their wake with the highest amounts being in northeastern Ohio, western Pennsylvania, West Virginia, western, central and northern New York, southern Ontario and southern Quebec. The East Coast received winds gusting to 73 miles per hour (118 kilometres per hour) along with precipitation ranging from a light slush in Washington to freezing rain in parts of New England. The temperatures in the area of greatest snowfall were about normal, but substantially colder than normal temperatures were experienced throughout the southeastern United States, such that 5 inches (13 cm) of snowfall fell in North Carolina, light snowfall occurred in Mississippi, Alabama and Georgia, and citrus crops were threatened in central Florida.

== Overall impact ==
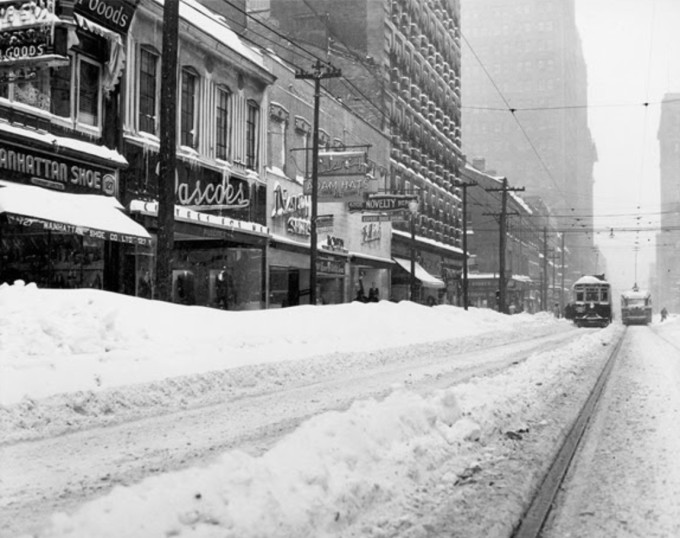
Streetcar route partly cleared in Downtown Toronto, likely on December 12, 1944

The societal impact of the Great Snowstorm was assessed by the National Weather Service of the US as having Regional Snowfall Index (RSI) value of 9.504 in the Ohio Valley Region and 2.155 on the Northeast Region, while its two initiating storm systems had an RSI of 1.784 on the Upper Midwest and 1.989 on the Southeast. The ranking in the Ohio Valley Region labels it as a Category 3 ("Major") snowstorm while the rankings in the other three regions were as a Category 1 ("Notable") snowstorm. The total RSI of the storm is 15.3 which would rank it as a Category 4 ("Crippling") Snowstorm, the second highest category after Category 5 ("Extreme"), and place it seventh all-time in the RSIs for snowstorms in the Northeast. As well, the area of snowfall of 12 inches (30 cm) or greater affected more people than all snowstorms in the Ohio Valley Region between 1932 and 1967 aside from the Great Appalachian Storm of November 1950.

The impacts of the snowstorm on southern Ontario and southern Quebec in Canada are not accounted for in the U.S. National Weather Service's RSI. The snowfall received by downtown Toronto and surrounding areas is the highest from any storm since 1872 and among the highest in history for most other cities in the Golden Horseshoe at the western end of Lake Ontario, although other winter storms are considered to have had a greater impact on southwestern Ontario (see Great Blizzard of 1978), eastern Ontario and the southern portions of the Niagara Peninsula (see Blizzard of 1977), and the Blizzard of 1999, together with snowstorms which affected Toronto over the following 14 days, may have had a greater accumulative impact on Toronto.

== Fatalities and injuries ==
Final tallies of fatalities from the combined storm system ranged from 87 to 100 for the US and 21 to 24 for Canada, all of Canada's being in southern Ontario. The deaths in the US occurred in at least 16 states from Colorado in the west and Arkansas in the south, to Maine in the northeast, with Pennsylvania, Ohio, New York and Michigan having the greatest number.

The exact causes of death in the Midwest and Great Plains states (Indiana and westward) were predominantly vehicular accidents, whereas for Michigan about half of the fatalities were on account of vehicular accidents. For Ohio, southern Ontario, western Pennsylvania and western New York, the areas which had the quickest snowfall and, generally, the highest snowfall—which resulted in roads that were largely physically undriveable until they were properly plowed—causes aside from vehicular accidents were prevalent, these including: heart attacks from exhaustion from struggling to walk through snow drifts in blizzard conditions, or from shovelling or pushing cars out of snow drifts or from the stress of a car being stuck in the snow, or from shovelling in general; sledding ("coasting") accidents, including colliding with moving vehicles; vehicles hitting pedestrians, who in some cases were walking on roads as sidewalks were unwalkable; a streetcar overturning; exposure to the cold; electrocution by wires that fell due to high winds; and, death from traumatic, delayed child birth (see the below sections for these four jurisdictions for details on fatalities and references). In the 21st century, some of these, such as shovelling not involving a trapped car or sledding, are classified by some sources as "indirect" rather than "direct" deaths from a snowstorm.

Numerous injuries from causes similar to the fatalities, plus from falls, were reported in various newspapers, but only for Toronto was a tablulation reported, which was of about 100 serious injuries, including 54 fracture cases, for the 30 hours of the storm. In Pittsburgh, in the 24 hours at the height of the snowstorm, severe injuries reported (i.e. fractures and internal injuries) included six people when a trolley hit a transport truck, a bus driver in a collision, four workers or pedestrians hit by vehicles, one person from a fall, and three youngsters from sledding accidents. Amongst cities impacted by the western storm, Chicago reported "scores of injuries from falls", including one cracked skull, and two severe injuries from a car-subway train collision, in one 24-hour period from December 10 to 11, during which time four deaths also occurred. In St. Louis, a major hospital reported 30 people had required treatment for injuries suffered from falls on icy sidewalks or roads in one 24-hour period, and in a second 24-hour period, six severe fracture cases from falls, including a skull fracture (which resulted in death), were reported.

== Impacts on most affected areas ==
=== Ohio ===
While Cincinnati and Toledo received 4.5 and 4 inches (11 and 10 centimetres) of snow, respectively, from the storm on December 11, snowfalls rose to 9.7 inches (25 cm) in Cleveland, 11.5 inches (29 cm) in Akron and 14.8 inches (38 cm) in Youngstown in the northeast of the state where the snow carried over into December 12. Forty mph (64 km/h) winds created blizzard conditions in some areas and blew the snow into high drifts which completely blocked many major highways for one to two days and secondary highways for two or three days. Near the northwest town of Waterville, 50 vehicles, including trucks, buses and private automobiles, were stranded in one section of highway. Intercity bus transportation was halted for two days, with reported 15-foot (4.6-metre) banks blocking buses from Cincinnati from reaching Columbus and a State Highway Official stating much of their road-clearing equipment had been damaged by futile attempts to remove such high drifts.

Most trucking lines were brought to a standstill, with one company indicating 180 of their trucks were either stuck in snow near or waiting in Akron until they could proceed. In Akron, 110 of the city's 131 buses were mired in snow drifts at one point on December 12 and taxi companies pulled their cars from the road at 1 p.m. that day; bus service did return to 90% until late December 13. Towing companies estimated to callers that there was a seven-hour wait to tow cars, chiefly because many of their tow trucks had themselves gotten stuck in the snow; with so many people stranded downtown, people stormed hotel desks to get rooms for the night.

Trains arriving in Ohio cities were between two and twelve hours late on December 12 and many were late on December 13 as well. Air travel from northeastern Ohio airports, such as Cleveland, Akron and Youngstown, was halted for December 12 and part of December 13, and the Cleveland evening newspapers did not publish their late editions for December 12. Several major war plants were shut down for December 12, including those in Youngstown, Sandusky and Chillicothe, and electricity and telephone communication were out in numerous counties. Twelve people were killed in Ohio on account of the storm, specific causes including heart attacks from pushing vehicles out of snow drifts or the stress of being mired in snow drifts, pedestrians being hit by skidding motor vehicles, being an occupant of crashing vehicles, and electrocution (one person).

=== Pennsylvania ===
Large areas of western Pennsylvania received a foot of snow or more from the Great Snowstorm, with Titusville and Warren in the inland northwest, receiving 26 and 18 inches (66 and 46 centimetres) of snow, respectively. Coupled with high winds, keeping the area's highways clear became very difficult, prompting the State Highway Superintendent to state "we're getting nowhere," adding that as fast as they plowed the roads the snow drifted back over them. Thousands of vehicles were stranded along highways and country roads, including hundreds of transport trucks and many cars on the Pennsylvania Turnpike—many of the occupants of these vehicles which needed to get shelter at nearby farm houses or service centres until the Turnpike was cleared almost a day later. Hundreds of deer hunters were trapped in the forest belts northeast of Pittsburgh and had to spend four to five days sheltering in hunting cabins or in trailers, trucks or automobiles, with one being found unconscious in a snow drift with their legs badly frozen.

Once the snow stopped on December 13, the winds increased, gusting to 73 mph (117 km/h), which turned the streets that had been a least partly cleared and had turned slushy, into hard bumpy, ridges of ice, further crippling transportation. The storm's death toll in western Pennsylvania was 16, including 15 in the Pittsburgh District and one in the City of Erie, the latter being a person found dead in his marooned car. When the storm moved easterly, the precipitation changed to rain or freezing rain in most of central and eastern Pennsylvania, with one death and one severe injury occurring in Philadelphia when two workers spreading sand at an ice-covered intersection were hit by a car.

==== Erie ====
The storm unexpectedly deposited 10.3 inches (26 cm) of snow on Erie the afternoon and evening of Monday, December 11, followed by a further 16.2 inches (41 cm) on Tuesday, December 12—a total of 26.5 inches (67 cm)—leaving the City completely isolated, industry crippled and commerce at a standstill. Described as the "most paralyzing storm in Erie's history", 50 m/hr winds whipped the snow into 5- and 6-foot (1.5-1.8 metre) drifts. Local bus service was halted the night of December 11; many buses never made it back to the garage and plows sent out to rescue them got stalled in snow drifts as well.

By late December 12, some buses began running again and by the morning of December 13, half of the fleet was operating, although some were still getting stuck, requiring their riders to get out to push them out of snow drifts. On December 14, while intercity buses began running again, most of the city's streets, as well as nearby suburban highways and country roads, remained clogged—bulldozers were needed to tackle many of them as snow plows alone could not do it. Later on December 14, after another 3.4 inches (8.6 cm) of snow fell on Erie, the Mayor declared a State of Emergency and requested additional snow-clearing equipment from the state as, although city buses were able to run, most private transportation was still inoperable. Schools in Erie only reopened on Monday, December 18, after being closed for four school days.

==== Pittsburgh ====
Heavy snow hit Pittsburgh in the early afternoon of December 11 and by dinner-time transportation in the city was crippled; streetcars, trolleys and buses were immobile and auto traffic on roads leaving the downtown was at a standstill due to accidents and deep snow. Thousands of office workers and Christmas shoppers were trapped downtown for the night—as all hotels filled up rapidly, the stranded people ended up spending the night sleeping in hotel lobbies and ballrooms, railroad stations, bus stations and the County Courthouse. Some people spent 4 to 5 hours walking home, many using the automobile and streetcar tunnels through Mount Washington on the west side of the Monongahela River, which were otherwise unused since cars and streetcars could not get to them. War plant workers could not get home so they stayed overnight and the next shifts could not get in, so production slumped significantly, and 24 mines in the District were closed on December 12.

The 10.7 inches (27 cm) of snow Pittsburgh received on December 11 remains the second highest single-day snowfall in the city's history; including December 12, the storm deposited 15.0 inches (38 cm). Removing the snow was a major problem for Pittsburgh—the City dumped thousands of truckloads of snow from the city's downtown into the Allegheny and Monongahela Rivers but it still took four days until most downtown streets were clear. Clearing the streets was impeded by thousands of vehicles marooned along downtown and suburban streets and on country roads and highways even two days after the storm. On December 12, streetcars were running, although behind schedule, but it wasn't until December 14, the same day schools and Universities reopened after being closed two days, that trolley and buses were able to provide somewhat regular service. Air travel in and out of Pittsburgh was suspended from December 11 until December 14 and intercity bus, car or truck travel was minimal for two days until highways could be properly plowed.

Residential streets were not cleared for several days during which time regular deliveries of coal to homes were impossible. In the cases of sick or disabled persons or other emergency need for coal, the coal companies were undertaking emergency coal deliveries, but were sometimes thwarted due to snow banks blocking residential streets and driveways. Some rural townships just outside the City of had a very difficult time plowing all the local country roads; scores of families in one Township, some needing medical attention and others faced with only minimal food, remained snowbound three to four days after the storm due to snow too deep for the Township's plows. Fifteen people died in the Pittsburgh District, most from heart attacks from shovelling or pushing or digging cars out of snow, but some were pedestrians being hit by vehicles and a few were found dead in marooned cars. Two houseboats in Pittsburgh sank due to heavy snow but no injuries were inflicted.

=== West Virginia ===
Clarksburg, received 19 inches (48 cm) of snow but other areas of West Virginia received 30 inches (76 cm) of snow on December 12, with the peak snowfall in North America (36 inches/91.4 cm) occurring in Ekins in Randolf County, that area's highest snowfall in half a century. As roads and highways were generally impassible, particularly through the Appalachian Mountains, all buses throughout the state were cancelled, most schools were closed, mines shutdown, and in parts of the state, the storm snapped telephone and electricity lines. A two-coach passenger train was missing for over a day in snow banks about 45 miles (72 km) west of Charleston and a rescue train itself got marooned in deep drifts and broken tree branches 10 miles (16 km) short of the first train. The adjacent parts of northwestern Maryland were similarly affected, with as much as 15 to 20 inches (38 to 51 centimetres) of snow and drifts of 10 feet (3.0 metres), caused by 40 m/ph (65 km/h) winds, blocking several highways. One person died from exposure in the western part of the Maryland and two people died and several others were seriously injured in vehicle crashes, one involving a bus, caused by icy roads elsewhere in the state. Parts of Virginia's northern and western sections also received substantial amounts of snow and primary highways were not able to be cleared until December 14 at which time secondary highways were still blocked.

=== New York ===
Beginning with 4 to 5 inches (10 to 13 centimetres) on December 11 and peaking on December 12, Buffalo and Rochester in western New York received 13.6 and 22.3 inches (35 and 57 centimetres) of snow, respectively, from the storm, while Syracuse received 18.2 inches (46 cm) over three days commencing December 12. The Mayors of Buffalo and Rochester declared States of Emergency and schools, universities, department stores, restaurants, and most public buildings were closed on December 12 in both cities. Most war production plants and other larger factories in all three cities were closed for at least a day as well. Rail transport and intercity bus service through central New York to Syracuse, Rochester, Buffalo and areas further west was at a standstill on December 12 and 13 due to snow drifts from the storm.

Smaller cities, such as Jamestown in the southwest, with 26 inches (66 cm) over four days, Binghamton in the south-central area of the state with 12 inches (30 cm), and Watertown in the north of the state with 11 inches (28 cm), also received substantial snowfalls. New York City had only a sprinkling of snow and high winds, which resulted in most flights being cancelled. Eleven people died in New York State from the snowstorm—some due to heart attacks from the exhaustion of shoveling or walking in snow, some from vehicular accidents, including as pedestrians, and an expectant mother and her baby after the mother spent eight hours struggling to get to the Lockport Hospital, during which time an ambulance carrying her got trapped in a snow drift and the first municipal plow sent to extricate the ambulance broke down.

==== Rochester ====
Aside from the now-closed grade-separated Rochester Subway, transportation in Rochester was completely paralyzed by the 22 inch-plus snowfall—"hundreds of buses" were marooned all over the city and its suburbs; only one main bus route was somewhat operational of December 12; cars and trucks were immobile and mired in snow drifts everywhere; and, workers whose shifts were ending could not get home, and vice versa. Some war plants, as well as the Eastman Kodak manufactory, kept some stranded workers working overtime and set up cots for them to sleep, but eventually they closed down for a day or more. The night of December 12, several hundred workers or shoppers who were stranded in downtown Rochester were accommodated by cots in hotel hallways or even the conversion of single hotel rooms to dormitory-style rooms.

Power outages cut power to one war plant and to hundreds of homes and high voltage wires crossed lighting circuits burning out 1,600 street lights. Only 35% of the operators for the telephone company were able to get to work December 12 and, as telephone calls soared, operators were working long hours of overtime—on December 13 over one million calls were attempted (compared to 530,000 on a normal day) but only 715,000 could be put through. The Rochester Democrat and Chronicle published a reduced number of newspapers for December 13 and stated it was unfeasible to disbritute them beyond downtown hotels and newsstands. It also indicated that until the snow emergency was ameliorated, the paper would omit all advertising in order to reduce the weight of newspapers to be delivered.

Thirty-four of the 41 independent contractors assigned by the city to clear snow declined to do so as the verbally-agreed-upon rate of pay was based on the distance plowed, not the amount of snow needing to be plowed or the amount of time required. Accordingly, the removal of snow from roads and sidewalks was severely delayed, meaning private vehicle travel was extremely difficult and most bus routes were inoperational for several days, which led to the decision to close schools until after the Christmas Break and to most war plants only resuming normal production four days after the storm.

To deliver emergency food and/or medicine to about 50 snow-bound homes, a group of ten people rode on horseback; they were also available to transport doctors to emergencies, if necessary. Food deliveries could not be made to the stores and markets of the city, which were mostly downtown—on December 13 only 3 truckloads of milk of the usual 70 truckloads was able to be delivered to the city. Only on December 15 was close to the usual daily amount of food finally able to be delivered, including the first vegetables and fruits, although the dairies pleaded for people "to dig up any bottles that might be buried in snow" as there was a shortage of milk bottles; with the then snow-blocked usual home delivery of milk, the delivery person picked up the used bottles.

On December 14, Rochester requested assistance from surrounding municipalities and from the New York State Governor—the state provided 20 heavy-duty plows that were finished plowing state highways and roads in their respective areas; the arrival of heavy-plows was fortitious as colder weather the evening of December 15 made the snow harder-packed, almost ice-like, which required heavy-duty plows. By December 16, about nine of the city's 15 bus routes were finally operating, on December 17, 80% of city streets had been plowed to some extent and all city bus routes were operating, although some suburban routes were still suspended, and on December 18, the airport finally reopened as snow plows were available to clear the runways.

=== Ontario ===
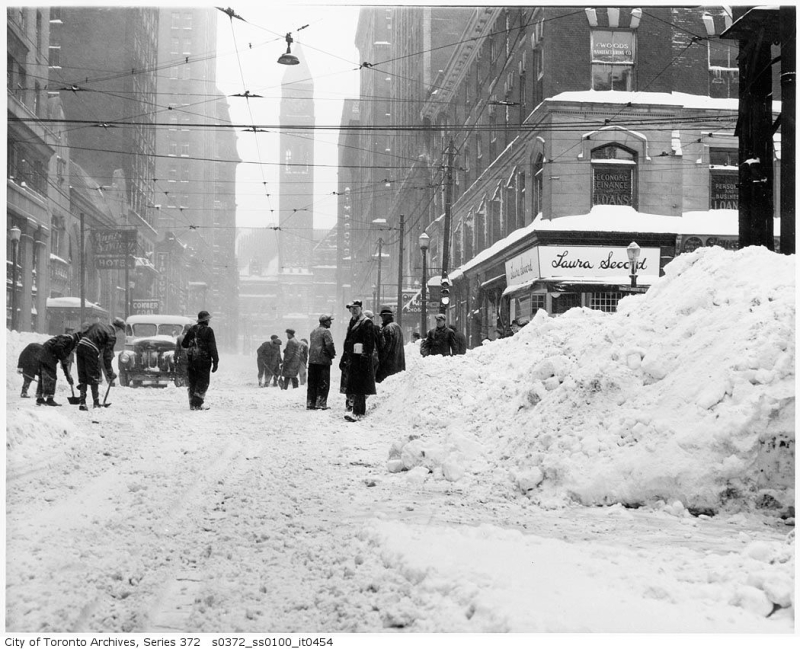
Bay Street in Toronto Looking Towards City Hall on December 12, 1944

Most of Southern Ontario, received 20 cm (7.9 in) or more of snow which, after being blown into snow drifts by substantial winds, blocked most highways, leaving most cities, towns and hamlets isolated for up to a day or more. Within most cities and towns, local car travel and transit was mostly impossible as well, and for most, intercity bus travel did not resume for at least two days because highways were initially only plowed a minimal width. In southwestern Ontario, where snowfall began late on December 10 or early on December 11, accumulations included 22.3 cm (8.8 in) in Windsor, 25.6 cm (10.1 in) in London, and 20.3 cm (8.0 in) in Kitchener. In eastern Ontario, snowfall accumulations included 35.5 cm (14.0 in) in Peterborough, 31.0 cm (12.2 in) in Kingston, and 20.1 cm (7.9 in) in Ottawa. Areas along Lake Huron and Georgian Bay received minimal snow, with Owen Sound, situated in-between those two bodies of water, recording 8.4 cm (3.3 in), although Orillia in Central Ontario to the east of Georgian Bay, received 31.0 cm (12.2 in).

The Orangeville-Georgetown area received 40.3 cm (15.9 in) of snow and hundreds of people in rural areas near there were stranded without power or telephone service for days until the roads could be cleared. In Woodstock, located on Highway 2, the main highway between London and Toronto, 100 trucks were stalled in snow or waiting within the city for the highway to be cleared on December 12. West of London, a convoy of 25 US army trucks, mostly driven by women, were stuck in snow drifts for several hours on December 12. Most of Ontario's main highways (Highways 2, 3, 5, 6, 7, 8 and the Queen Elizabeth Way) were all open to at least car-widths by December 14 as 100 airmen from the Royal Canadian Air Force operated the Force's plows along those routes beginning late December 12. However, the Department of Highways still advised on December 14 it considered the highways open only to essential traffic as snowpiles/banks right next to the edge of driving lanes needed to be pushed back.

Ottawa was not significantly impacted by the storm as milk deliveries continued, streetcar service operated mostly on schedule and roads were all plowed by the morning of December 13, although intercity bus service was paused until late December 13. At least 21 fatalities occurred in Ontario due to the storm—aside from multiple fatalities in Toronto and Hamilton, single fatalities occurred in Oshawa, Brantford, Campbellford, Woodstock and Richmond Hill, most from heart attacks from exhaustion.

==== Toronto ====
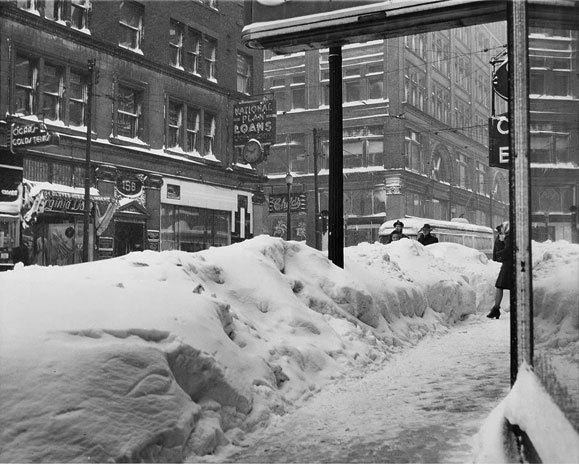
Snow banks in Toronto after the storm on December 12

Beginning with flurries on December 11, and intensifying after midnight and ending that afternoon, the Great Snowstorm deposited 57.2 cm (22.5 in) of snow on Toronto, which is still the second most in the city's history (behind 58.5 cm in 1872). (Note: The Agincourt weather station, 17 km northeast of downtown Toronto, received 67.3 cm (26.5 in) of snow over the two days.) The 48.3 cm (19.0 in) of snow on December 12 remains the single-day record for the city. Winds of at least 50 km/h (30 m/ph) piled many drifts as high as 3 metres (9.8 feet), trapping some people in their homes. On December 12, moving around the city was almost impossible and all schools, the University of Toronto, the Toronto Stock Exchange, courts, department stores and 80% of other stores and businesses never opened that day. The Toronto Daily Star published limited copies for December 12 and The Globe and Mail cancelled its December 13 paper. Only the Yonge, King and Queen lines of Toronto's 15 streetcars lines were able to be kept open all day, but only at a reduced and slower service level, as every section that was cleared was soon refilled by both drifting and newly-fallen snow. Bus service was suspended and commuter train lines were mostly blocked, leaving people in suburbs, such as Weston, Leaside and Long Branch, isolated. (Note: One streetcar derailed on Yonge Street north of Eglinton Avenue blocking all service north of there; a number of buses were trapped in the snow in a zig-zag position on Eglington Avenue east near Avenue Road blocking all traffic; at 11:15 am, 36 streetcars were stuck one-behind-the-other on Avenue Road north of Bloor Street; and, hundreds of private cars were trapped in snow drifts all over the city.)

Numerous war production factories and other industries did not operate because only a small percentage workers could get to them; in most cases they did not restart operations until the late afternoon shift on December 13 or the morning of December 14. Workers ending their night shifts could not get home; 200 workers at Victory Aircraft in Malton in four buses and numerous private cars were stranded for over 12 hours in the hamlet of Woodhill as Highway 7 to Brampton where they lived was totally blocked by 2-metre (6.6-foot) snow drifts. They slept in a school and two service stations with food in the hamlet's stores nearing depletion. Workers at the oil refinery in Port Credit, as well as six buses and several transport trucks, were marooned by snow drifts for over 24 hours.

The Mayor directed people to stay home unless their jobs were essential, while the Province issued an order banning all non-essential vehicles from any streets in Toronto with streetcar tracks, that being most of the main roads. The blocked roads to and within the rural areas around Toronto prevented almost all milk, other food and coal from being delivered to the city on December 12; only 3% of the usual milk supply arrived. The Mayor, the evening of December 12, broadcast on the radio a request that people restrict bread and milk consumption and the City transported emergency food to fire halls the next day, from where residents could make purchases if stores were inaccessible. By December 14, the city was arranging for emergency coal distribution to 26 fire halls as households without coal were unable to heat their homes or cook food. Milk deliveries from farmers could not increase to approaching normal levels until December 14 and even then the supply was endangered for a few additional days on account of an acute shortage (100,000) of milk bottles, prompting the Toronto Milk Producer's Association to issue a plea for residents to return any bottles they had.

By late evening of December 12, the roads and tracks had been cleared to permit 12 of Toronto's 15 streetcar lines to operate, although with less cars than usual as 70 drivers were still needed to clear snow. (Note: At one point, over 1,600 men, 250 trucks—including 30 from the Royal Canadian Army—and 50 other pieces of equipment, including privately-owned bulldozers, which the City had appealed to use, were employed to clear streets of snow. Normally, the TTC had 24 sweepers, five scrapers, six plows and 24 storm cars for snow clearance.) On the morning of December 14, most suburban bus and commuter train lines were finally operating and schools, many stores and businesses reopened. Only on December 16 were most of the city's 920 km (570 mi) of roads passable—that meant one-lane's width cleared.

Between 13 and 16 people died in Toronto, most from heart attacks from struggling through deep snow and two from heart attacks while shovelling. One person died when a streetcar turned on its side, with 43 passengers suffering injuries, 10 seriously. An estimated 100 people were seriously injured in Toronto from falls and other accidents caused by the storm, with at least 54 of those being fractures. Hospitals were overflowing and ambulances were incapable of making trips due to the deep snow. (Note: By December 14, hospitals were having further capacity problems as they could not release mothers and their newborns since ambulances or their families' vehicles could not transverse the uncleared residential streets to the get them home safely, yet expectant mothers were arriving at the hospital earlier than usual to avoid transportation issues and some mothers seemed to be going into labour days or weeks early due to the stress of the snowstorm. In addition, hundred of surgeries had been cancelled on the days of the storm so those patients were still in the hospitals and even once the surgeries were completed, it was difficult to discharge them without reliable, stress-free transportation being available.) Transportation into Toronto was greatly hindered: the airport had no flights for over 36 hours; trains were delayed by up to ten hours on December 12 and 13 due to electrical switches in the multi-track junctions near Toronto being smothered with ice and snow; and, no intercity buses ran until late on December 13.

==== Hamilton and Niagara ====
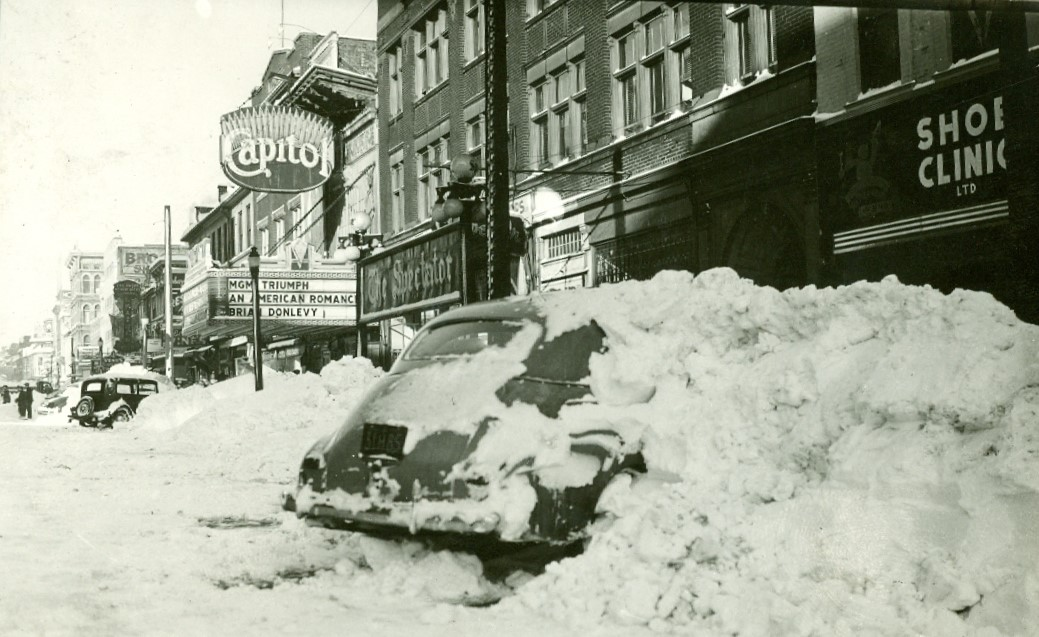
King Street in Hamilton after the snowstorm of December 11–12, 1944

The highest snowfalls in Ontario were in Hamilton with 62.5 cm (24.6 in) and St. Catharines with 66 cm (26 in). The storm caused the complete curtailment of streetcar and bus service in Hamilton for over a day and only minimal service being available for an additional day. One neighbourhood, population 10,000, was only reached by plows the morning of December 14 after two nights of isolation without any deliveries of food or coal. McMaster University was closed for two days, public schools were closed three days, most milk or bread deliveries did not occur for three days, and it took five days for all transit operations, including suburban buses, to return to regular service. The QEW and other highways from Hamilton to the rest of the Niagara Peninsula were blocked with snow for almost two days—the QEW had 3 and 3.5-metres (10 and 12 feet) of snow in some valley areas. All bus or street railway service within and between urban areas in eastern Niagara was suspended for up to two days; this prompted people to utilize horse-drawn sleighs to get around, including by the St. Catharines Standard to deliver its newspapers. In Welland, which received 43.2 cm (17.0 in) of snow, 1,000 workers at the Welland Chemical Works were stranded at the plant overnight until a bulldozer cleared the access road. There were three fatalities in the region, all in Hamilton.

=== Quebec ===
Montreal received 29.9 cm (11.8 in) of snow, mostly on December 12, accompanied by 48 m/ph (77 km/h) gales, but it had staff of 1,500 men and more than 620 pieces of equipment ready to work in 12-hour shifts to clear snow, so the storm did not substantially impact the city even though it was still recovering from a 41.9 cm (16.5 in) snowfall earlier in the month. Streetcar transit had no substantial disruptions other than drivers having to drive slowly due to poor visibility from the snow/wind combination. Flights were grounded for 24 hours but train service remained normal aside from trains from Toronto, which were delayed four to ten hours on December 12 and 13. Other cities in Quebec received lighter amounts of snow on December 12 and 13—Quebec City 6.4 cm (2.5 in), Sherbrooke 8.4 cm (3.3 in) and Chicoutimi 8.7 cm (3.4 in).

== See also ==
- Great Blizzard of 1978
- Blizzard of 1977
- 1971 Great Lakes blizzard
