= 1971 Great Lakes blizzard =

Major snowstorms in Great Lakes Region of North America

Meteorological history
- Formed: January 25, 1971
- Dissipated: January 31, 1971

Blizzard
- Max. snowfall: 127.6 centimetres (50 in) - recorded at Paisley, Bruce County, Ontario

Overall effects
- Fatalities: at least 34 in United States and 14 in Canada
- Areas affected: Great Lake States and Provinces of North America

The Great Lakes Blizzard of January 1971 affected almost the entire Great Lakes region of North America, as well as the western St. Lawrence Valley and northern New England between January 25 and 28, 1971 before a second severe snowstorm hit many of the same areas between January 28 and 31, 1971. The areas that felt the fiercest effects of the dual storms, that being moderate or heavy snow, sustained high winds, and zero visibility due to blowing snow, included southern Wisconsin, most of Michigan, Southern Ontario, northeastern Ohio, northwestern Pennsylvania, most of upstate New York and Southern Quebec, while northern Wisconsin, northern Indiana, northeastern Ontario, and northern Vermont experienced blizzard conditions from the first of the storms.

The only part of the Great Lakes not impacted was the northern area of Lake Superior. Weather related to the first storm system also inflicted gale-force winds on areas just south of the Great Lakes, on the Central Appalachian Mountains and on much of the Eastern Seaboard of the United States, particularly, from North Carolina to Maryland, and on Maine. Several major metropolitan areas were hit by the dual blizzards, although most did not have major snowfalls; London, Ontario with 68.6 centimetres (27.0 in), Quebec City with 54.1 centimetres (21.3 in), and Rochester, New York with 16.9 inches (43 cm) were the cities with the most snowfall, with areas around London (the Lake Huron Region of Southwestern Ontario) and Rochester (west-central New York) being subjected to all or part of six consecutive days of blizzard conditions and/or snowfall. The single highest snowfall was in Paisley, Ontario, which, over seven days, saw 127.6 centimetres (50.2 in) of snow.

The storms left at least 34 people dead in the United States and 14 people dead in Canada with numerous persons injured from traffic accidents or other mishaps, such as train derailments or falling glass. Schools, businesses, major highways and secondary roads were closed or blocked for at least a day throughout most of the affected states/provinces and in the most heavily affected portions of those jurisdictions (often areas impacted by both storms), these items were closed or blocked for up to a week, intra- and inter-city bus service was halted, flights were cancelled, train travel was delayed, large power outages occurred, thousands of vehicles had to be abandoned, and tens of thousands of people, including thousands of students, were stranded for between one and three nights.

== Meteorological history ==
A low pressure system formed on the northern Great Plains of the US, and started erratically moving eastward supported by high-level winds that were pushing cold air southward from the Arctic. By late January 25, the low pressure system had deepened and had been joined by a smaller disturbance from the U.S. Southwest to become massive in size and moved over the western Great Lakes, accelerated by a strong high pressure system to its west. Its leading edge moving at 100 mph (160 km/h)), it broadened into a cold front covering a large area of central North America from the Upper Great Lakes to the southern Appalachian Mountains, with cold wave warnings being issued for as far south as Arkansas, Alabama and Georgia.

The low pressure system moved over the relatively warm Great Lakes and into Michigan, Southern Ontario and Upstate New York on January 26, drawing in moisture from the Lakes which, along with winds gusting as high as 70 mph (110 km/h), created blizzard conditions in the surrounding areas, with some areas receiving heavy snowfall. The front edge of the blizzard quickly moved into the St. Lawrence Valley and rampaged through northwestern New England and southern Quebec on January 27, dropping heavy snow, hail and sleet. Later on January 27, the storm had two centers—one over central Maine and the other over Quebec City—and its strength began to weaken in Maine before it moved into southern New Brunswick and then Nova Scotia. The southern portion of the cold front moved rapidly through the Central Appalachians and the Eastern Seaboard from North Carolina to Maryland the afternoon of January 26, creating winds up to 78 mph (126 km/h) for up to two days, together with variable precipitation, including hail, rain and, in parts of the Appalachians, snow.

A second major but narrower snowstorm/low pressure system arose in North and South Dakota on January 28, brought snow to Iowa and Minnesota, and gained intensity as it briskly moved through Wisconsin, the Upper and Lower Peninsulas of Michigan, Southern Ontario, northwestern Pennsylvania, upstate New York and southern Quebec. It brought snow and high winds up to 60 mph (97 km/h), causing severe snow drifting and low visibility conditions, in some regions until January 30. As a result, certain areas, including Southwestern Ontario and the western half of New York, received snow and high winds for all or parts of five to six straight days, crippling those areas for the entire period, including shutting down schools and industries and stranding travellers.

== Overall impact ==
Neither of the storms are on the US National Weather Service's (NWS) Regional Snowfall Index lists for the Upper Midwest, Upper Ohio Valley or Northeastern US, although this Index focuses on snowfall and the size of population affected by snowfall whereas the greatest impact of these storms was their winds causing blizzard conditions and high drifts of snow, not uniformly high snowfall. Further, the areas of greatest snowfall were in Ontario in the leeward side of Lake Huron and Georgian Bay, and in Quebec City area, both within Canada, which are not considered in the US Regional Snowfall Index.

While damage occurred due to high winds and private and public road transportation was severely affected in major urban centres such as Detroit, Cleveland, Chicago, Pittsburgh, Toronto and Buffalo, it was London with 68.6 centimetres (27.0 in), Quebec City with 54.1 centimetres (21.3 in), Rochester with 16.9 inches (43 cm), Syracuse, New York with 13.1 inches (33 cm), Ottawa with 29 centimetres (11 in), and Montreal with 26.5 centimetres (10.4 in) which had the most snow from five or six days of storm conditions. Smaller centres with the greatest snowfalls included: Paisley, Ontario with 127.6 centimetres (50.2 in) over a week, Oswego, New York with 22.1 inches (56 cm), Watertown, New York, with 18.8 inches (48 cm), and Sault Ste. Marie, Michigan with 17.5 inches (44 cm).

Some of the most severe impacts of the dual blizzards were on the London/Lake Huron Region of Southern Ontario, and most of Western and Central New York; in these areas blizzard conditions of less than a quarter-mile (400 m) visibility lasted for 32 and 29 non-stop hours, respectively, on January 26 and 27 resulting in the blockage and later closure of Highway 401 between London and various sections to its east at various times over two days and the complete closure of the entire New York State Thruway west of Utica for almost two days. Both freeways were formally closed again during the second blizzard on January 29. During both closures hundreds of people needed to find sudden overnight accommodation, such as at highway service centres, government buildings and hotels. Thirteen counties in New York banned all vehicular travel on roads and highways during the first blizzard, while numerous highways in Ontario's Lake Huron Region were formally closed or totally blocked by snow for two to three days. Over 20,000 students in Ontario were not able to be transported home from school on January 26 and had to spend between one and three nights at their schools or billeted at homes in the communities; some schools boards kept some or all of their schools closed for four to six days because many rural roads were not fully cleared due to ongoing drifting of snow. Significant numbers of students and workers in the Rochester-area were also stranded overnight.

Many parts of Michigan also experienced completely blocked or closed roads and closed schools, as did much of Southern Quebec. In Montreal, blizzard conditions lasted 16 consecutive hours and the port was closed for January 27. Northeastern Ohio had thousands of people stranded due to the second blizzard and Interstate 90 in the adjacent area of Pennsylvania was closed for a time period. The second blizzard hit Wisconsin very hard resulting in five counties closing all their roads during that storm. All of the above areas pulled snow plows from their roads for extended periods due to absolute zero visibility conditions making collisions with marooned vehicles probable.

== Fatalities and injuries ==
At least 15 persons died in the US from the first blizzard. (Note: The Indianapolis Star article states 15 fatatities related to the storm transpired in the Midwest and Northeast, and 13 specific deaths are documented in newspaper articles referenced in each jurisdiction's section below. This seems to indicate the five fire-related deaths in Kentucky mentioned in the article are completely independent of weather-related deaths. The Philadelphia Inquirer article mentions 21 weather-related deaths, but this clearly seems to include the six in California which the Bagour newspaper article and the Indianapolis Star article both document.) At least four fatalities were in New York, six in Michigan, two in Pennsylvania and one in Indiana, with a total of seven being traffic-accident related, two being heart attacks, one being train-related, one being a pedestrian struck by a car, and one person being trapped in their car. By January 28, there were reports of more than 50 injuries from the Midwest to New England from the first storm, which would include numerous injuries due to high winds in cities like Chicago, Cleveland and Cincinnati, some south of the blizzard zone.

The second storm caused at least 19 fatalities in the US, six each in New York and Michigan, five in Wisconsin, and two in Pennsylvania. Eleven of the deaths were by traffic accidents, four were heart attacks from shovelling snow, two pedestrians were hit by vehicles, one person died from exposure, and one person drowned.

In Ontario, six persons died from the first blizzard: two people were hit by cars, one died in a traffic accident, a fourth died from a heart attack when trying to dig his truck out of a snowdrift, and two died from exposure. During the second blizzard, three persons died in a car-tanker truck accident. In Quebec, six persons died from the first blizzard, two from heart attacks, two pedestrians were stuck by cars, one death was from a traffic accident and one death was train related. No fatalities were reported in Quebec due to the second storm.

== Midwest U.S. ==
=== Wisconsin ===
The first storm system hit Wisconsin and northern Illinois late on January 25, dropping as much as 10 inches (25 cm) of snow on parts of Wisconsin, resulting in the closure of many schools for January 26. The second, narrower storm, which moved through on late January 28 and early January 29, three days after the first storm, mainly impacted southern and central Wisconsin with 50 mph (80 km/h) winds causing blizzard conditions which severely inhibited travel, cost five lives in traffic accidents—including a collision with a bus, a collision with a truck, a collision between a tractor-trailer and a salting truck, and a pedestrian being struck—and caused a 100-car pile-up on Interstate 94 in Hudson. Five countries declared all roads closed except for emergency vehicles and some pulled snow clearing equipment of the roads for a period citing them being a safety hazard for other vehicles in the zero visibility conditions and plows themselves ending up in ditches. Green Bay reported a temperature of −67 °F (−55 °C), taking into account the wind chill, although it escaped the worst of the snow and wind.

=== Illinois ===
While snow largely missed Chicago, the city was hit with 50 mph (80 km/h) winds that blew out plate-glass windows of several downtown restaurants and stores, and damaged trees, traffic lights, radar equipment at O'Hare Airport, and power lines, leaving about 10,000 residents without electricity. The storm brought extremely cold temperatures, which when coupled with the high winds, produced a wind chill temperature of −55 Fahrenheit (−48 Celsius) in Chicago. Commuter rail from Chicago's southeast was delayed up to 90 minutes by a freak accident in which high winds caused a string of empty coal train cars to roll down a grade in Burns Harbour, Indiana, smashing into a 91-car train, killing one crewperson and seriously injuring two others.

=== Indiana ===
Beginning after dawn on January 26, the northern third of Indiana experienced near blizzard conditions, which deposited 6 inches (15 cm) of snow on South Bend, Indiana, over two days. Wind gusts of 50 mph (80 km/h) caused drifting snow which made many roads impassable and 60 schools boards across the northern Indiana closed their schools, most by late morning on January 26, and remained closed for January 27. In central Indiana, 60 mph (97 km/h) wind gusts raced through Indianapolis triggering over 200 false fire alarms, ripping the roof off a car dealership, and snapping utility lines, which cut power to thousands of households.

== Michigan ==
Beginning early on January 26, the storm inflicted blizzard conditions on large areas of Michigan—from its southern corners to the eastern Upper Peninsula of the state—with wind-driven snow creating zero-visibility driving conditions on numerous highways and roads. In addition, numerous highways were blocked by snow drifts and, while the state's three interstate highways remained open (aside from during crash clean-ups), only single lanes were able to be kept clear in some areas. Thousands of cars, trucks and school buses had to be abandoned in huge batches along freeways and other main roads, thereby stranding thousands of motorists. Thousands of schools across the state were closed on January 26.

The blizzard hit the Upper Peninsula, including Sault Ste. Marie and the 13 counties of the northwest Lower Peninsula the hardest, dropping between 6 and 12 inches (15 and 30 cm) of blinding snow, leading authorities to close all highways and roads to all vehicles, including snow plows. All airports in the area, except one, closed for the day. Sault Ste. Marie received 8 more inches (20 cm) of snow on January 28–29 for a total of 17.5 inches (44 cm) for a five-day period. Cheboygan, at the northern tip of the Lower Peninsula, had such high winds coming off Lake Huron that there were 15-foot (4.6 m) snow drifts; everything—factories, schools, stores, offices—were closed for January 26 and all 6,000 residents stayed home for the day. On the eastern shore of Lake Michigan, 20,000 residents of Benton Harbor were without electricity, as the winds wreaked havoc on the power lines, while inland, the roofing on a building under construction at the Grand Rapids airport was torn off. In some southwestern counties of Michigan, schools were closed from January 26 through the end of January 28 as snowfall and drifting snow continued into January 28, with total accumulations of snow over the three days approaching 15 inches (38 cm). A four-wheel drive military ambulance was used in Cass County to deliver medicine, food and fuel, to pick up marooned motorists, and to push cars from the roadway to permit plowing, while in adjacent counties snowmobiles were used for food deliveries.

=== Metro Detroit area ===
Near Detroit wind gusts of 80 mph (130 km/h) ripped roofs from buildings, including the roof of a high school in Livonia, and blew people to the ground. In Northville, the winds blew over the Police Department's 90-foot (27 m) communications antenna, which landed on the car of the chief of police. Detroit itself had consistent winds of 30 to 45 mph (48 to 72 km/h) with a peak of 55 mph (89 km/h), leading General Motors and Chrysler to close down four plants in the mid-afternoon, and requiring the cancellation or delay of most flights. City staff applied 2,500 tons of salt onto arterial roads that morning, but in most cases the winds blew the salt away and blew snow onto the roads. Four pile-ups of between 22 and 35 vehicles occurred, one on the I-96 included about five semi-trucks which left one person critically injured and several others hospitalized, while closing the freeway for six hours, and another on I-95 that left 13 persons injured. Oakland, reported greater than 100 traffic accidents before noon on January 26, and the other four southeastern Michigan counties reported the volume of accidents left their telephone switchboards overwhelmed most of the day. Statewide, the blizzard contributed to four deaths, two being traffic accident deaths, both from cars being rear-ended, and another, a pedestrian struck by a vehicle.

The second winter storm brought 4 inches (10 cm) more snow to Detroit and much of Michigan's Lower Peninsula three days later, on January 29 and early January 30. The storm featured fierce winds gusting up to 50 mph (80 km/h) and blizzard and near-blizzard conditions in various urban areas, which slowed the evening rush hours to a crawl and again left many abandoned vehicles dotting the sides of major freeways. Hundreds of people had to spend hours or the night in makeshift accommodation, including the occupants of 200 cars blocked in a six-mile stretch of US Route 131, who bedded down in an American Legion Hall, private homes, buses and all-night restaurants. At least five people died in Michigan from the traffic accidents from the second storm, one a pedestrian, and one person died from exposure.

== Ontario ==
The dual blizzards affected virtually all areas of Southern Ontario and Northeastern Ontario causing the blockage or closure of dozens of highways and other roads and closing most schools for a day or more. Hardest hit was the London and Lake Huron Region of Southwestern Ontario where cities and towns were completely isolated for two or more days. Five Ontarians died from the blizzard on January 26: two people were hit by cars, one died in a traffic accident, a fourth died from a heart attack when trying to dig his truck out of a snowdrift, and a fifth died from exposure from trying to walk 6.3 km home. Another person was found dead from exposure on January 27. On January 29, during the second storm, three persons were killed in driving snow near Hamilton when a car slammed into a jack-knifed tanker truck. One person from Huron County was trapped in their car for 35 hours after sliding off the road into a snow bank on January 26, after which more snow fell on top of it, but was freed without severe injury.

=== Northeastern Ontario ===
The blizzard's first arrival in Ontario was in Sault Ste. Marie the evening of January 25 when it brought blowing snow and reduced visibility (about 1 kilometre [0.62 mi]) overnight and 17.3 centimetres (6.8 in) of snow over two days. More than 66 schools in the area were closed on January 26. Subsequent storm systems lashed the city over the next three days, with January 27 and 28 each having several hours of blizzard conditions (in Canada defined as visibility of 400 metres [0.25 mi] or less), and in total, dropping 27.5 centimetres (10.8 in) snowfall. January 28 and 29 saw 110 traffic accidents in Sault St. Marie.

The remainder of Northeastern Ontario was hit by the blizzard around dawn on January 26, with winds gusts as high as 108 km/h (67 mph) causing heavy drifting, sometimes as high as 1.5 metres (4.9 ft). Sudbury saw 22.4 centimetres (8.8 in) of snow, average winds of 82 km/h (51 mph) and had 12 hours of whiteout conditions with 0 or less than 200 metres (0.12 mi) of visibility. Some school buses were stuck in the snow that afternoon (and remained stuck 2 days later) such that many students in the Sturgeon Falls area did not get home until 10 p.m. One family of five spent 22 hours trapped in their car stuck in a snow bank about 110 km (68 miles) northwest of Sudbury, while 58 pupils were trapped at school overnight north of Kirkland Lake. As it was too dangerous for snow plows to operate during the white-out conditions, most roads were still clogged the next morning meaning school buses had to be cancelled; as a result most schools were closed by noon. Aside from Highway 17 running eastward from North Bay to Ottawa, virtually all major and secondary highways in the region, including those running south through Central Ontario, were undrivable until late in the day on January 27, meaning no intercity car or bus transportation could occur; all flights were also cancelled. In Kapukasing, the wind chill was measured as −61 °C (−78 °F) and caused the cancellation of mail delivery.

=== London and Lake Huron region ===
Blizzard conditions lasted all or parts of six days and dropped upward of 60 centimetres (24 in) of snow in the London and Lake Huron Region of Southwestern Ontario. The first blizzard initially struck areas on the east (leeward) side of Lake Huron around 9:30 a.m. on Tuesday, January 26—in Sarnia and elsewhere along the coast, heavy snow and high winds caused visibility to rapidly decline from several kilometres to 0 metres. By noon, the blizzard, with winds of 58 km/h (36 mph) gusting to 101 km/h (63 mph), had penetrated inland—in London visibility was reduced to 200 metres (0.12 mi) by noon, and by 5:00 p.m., it had dropped to virtually zero, where it would remain for 23 consecutive hours until 4:00 p.m. on January 27, a total of 32 straight hours of blizzard conditions (400 metres [0.25 mi] and less visibility). All areas north of London, east of Lake Huron, and west of Kitchener also experienced such conditions, although in most cases marginally less severe and for shorter duration. (Note: Mount Forest, on the eastern edge of the Region, had blizzard conditions for 16 straight hours commencing 1 p.m and, after a reprieve, near-blizzard conditions returned all afternoon January 27; Wiarton, at the northern edge of the area, had blizzard conditions (specifically, 200 to 400 metres [0.12 to 0.25 mi] visibility) from 1 to 11 p.m. and, while visibility was improved most of January 27, commencing at 5 p.m. it had a range of blizzard and near-blizzard conditions (ranging from 0 to 800 metres [0.00 to 0.50 mi] visibility) after midnight; and, Kitchener had blizzard conditions (specifically, visibility around 200 metres [0.12 mi]) from 1 p.m. until early the morning of January 27 but somewhat improved visibility conditions the rest of January 27.)

The blizzard pummelled London with 45.6 centimetres (18.0 in) of snow over 2 days, Woodstock with 40.9 centimetres (16.1 in), Exeter, 50 kilometres (31 mi) north, with 48.3 centimetres (19.0 in) and Paisley, 40 kilometres (25 mi) southwest of Owen Sound, with 40.7 centimetres (16.0 in). Areas on the eastern fringes of the Region, while subjected to blizzard or near-blizzard conditions on both days, had less snow, such as 20.7 and 10.4 centimetres (8.1 and 4.1 in) total in Mount Forest and Kitchener, respectively. Brantford, on the southeastern edge of Southwestern Ontario, experienced 41.1 centimetres (16.2 in) of snow from the first blizzard, the furthest easterly city in the province to receive such a high amount. Except for northern communities, such as Paisley, which received 16.3 centimetres (6.4 in) of snow, and Wiarton getting 6.6 centimetres (2.6 in), snowfalls were minimal on January 28, but most areas still had significant winds and blowing snow, causing reduced visibility in the range of 1 km for much of that day.

On Friday, January 29, the second blizzard, with wind gusts up to 85 km/h (53 mph), struck the Region, dropping between 15.5 and 20.3 centimetres (6.1 and 8.0 in) of snow on most areas over two days, although northern areas received up to double that. Most sections of the Region experienced periods of blizzard or near-blizzard conditions on January 29, the fourth straight day of blizzard-like conditions, and reduced visibility conditions on January 30. (Note: Wiarton had limited visibility of 400 to 800 metres (0.25 to 0.50 mi) all the daylight hours of January 29; in Mount Forest visibility fluctuated widely on January 29 and 30 but briefly dropped to 200 metres (0.12 mi) on January 30; and, London experienced blizzard conditions of 400 metres (0.25 mi) and less visibility from 3:30 p.m. on January 29 until 5:30 a.m. on January 30.) The winds, and hence, the blowing snow, eased somewhat on January 31, the sixth day since the first blizzard began, although all areas still experienced frigid temperatures approximating −15 °C (5 °F), taking into account the wind chill, plus received still more snow—4.8 centimetres (1.9 in) in London, 11.9 centimetres (4.7 in) in Wiarton and 9.7 centimetres (3.8 in) in Paisley. Paisley received a further 15.7 centimetres (6.2 in) on February 1, meaning over a seven-day period it was pummelled with 127.6 centimetres (4 ft 2.2 in) of snow. The blizzards dumped 67.5 centimetres (26.6 in) on London, 68.6 centimetres (27.0 in) on Exeter and 79.8 centimetres (31.4 in) on Wiarton over the period, and drifts of snow were far higher.

==== Highways impassable ====
In the London/Lake Huron Region, most provincial highways and county roads became blocked by snow within a few hours of the blizzard ascending, and the dangerous low visibility prompted the provincial Department of Highways to remove its snow plows from the highways. Highways west of Stratford (4, 7, 8, 19, 23, 83) remained blocked through January 27, and even once they were plowed, snowfall and snowdrifts would refill the plowed sections. Highway 21 near Amberly, with "mountainous drifts", was only cleared on January 30 after crews spent over two days working to clear all the snow. Near the intersection of Highways 7 and 22 between London and Sarnia, there was a "miles"-long collision of trucks, cars and police cruisers which had started around noon January 26 and just kept growing as more vehicles plowed into each other and into ditches over several hours. In Perth and Huron counties, several communities, including Goderich and Wingham, were still almost totally isolated when the second blizzard struck on January 29 and blocked all highways and roads even further, some with 3.5-metre (11 ft) snow drifts. Even highways that were kept open during the second blizzard, were only open for a single-lane of traffic, and drifting snow continued for up to three days after. Highway 8, the major highway to Goderich on the Lake Huron shore, was not fully cleared until February 1.

Numerous OPP and municipal police cruisers got mired in snow drifts and frigid cold winds forced officers to seek shelter in restaurants or nearby homes alongside other members of the public. Considering that any driving in the zero visibility conditions risked collisions, most OPP detachments and some local forces pulled their cruisers from roads for most of two days aside from for emergency calls and many did the same on January 29–30 when the second blizzard hit.

On January 26 and 27, Highway 401 connecting London to Woodstock, Kitchener and Toronto was blocked at numerous points and littered with abandoned cars, many from chain-reaction accidents of 20 or more cars. With other highways and other transportation modes also inhibited by the blizzard, London and Woodstock were completely cut-off from the rest of the province. Its worst section was near the exits for London where the OPP estimated there were hundreds of collisions. Late on January 27 they began diverting vehicles onto other highways to detour that stretch; the stretch was closed again during the second blizzard. The Premier of Ontario was being driven to London on January 26 and ended up spending that night and much of January 27 at the service centre near Ingersol, just east of London, along with about 350 other stranded people. He and his driver finally got a lift to London in an airport bus, but his driver ran in front of the vehicle part of the 5-hour crawl to avoid their hitting other cars in the absolutely whiteout conditions; many people were trapped at the service centre for two nights. The Woodstock Snowmobile Club was patrolling Highway 401 to pick up stranded motorists and deliver them to service centres or hotels.

Intercity bus service was drastically delayed before being totally suspended; two buses from Toronto arrived 17 hours late after being stuck in snowdrifts only 10 km from London for 9 hours, having picked up several stranded motorists along the way. Most airports in Southern Ontario were also closed most of January 26 and 27, so the only transportation mode running reasonably through most of Southern Ontario was the train, but even those were running up to three hours behind schedule and one train derailed after hitting a drift east of Kitchener, injuring three passengers and closing the northern main passenger line. A Canada National Railway snow plow train also got stuck in snow drifts north of London stranding its crew.

==== Rural areas isolated ====
In the Lake Huron Region, most county snow plows were called off the road by the afternoon of January 26 due to the complete whiteout conditions. Numerous people were stranded overnight, or sometimes as long as 2 or 3 days, at whatever building happened to be closest to them when their motor vehicle got stuck in the snow—meat shops, restaurants, strangers homes, farmsteads, churches, Legion Halls. A hotel in the Village of Lucan hosted 240 persons in its 60-person capacity building. At the Bruce Nuclear Power Development near Tiverton, 1,400 persons were isolated for over three days before roads could be cleared and then two buses carrying 75 of them got stuck in snow drifts in nearby Kincardine and the remaining 1,300 persons spent another day at the site. Attempts had been made on January 28 by the Canadian Armed Forces (CAF) to deliver food by helicopter but snow squalls had arisen that caused the plan to be aborted.

The high wind gusts wreaked havoc with electricity lines, causing fifty different areas in the London/Lake Huron Region to suffer blackouts. In Bruce County, wind gusts of up to 160 km/h (99 mph) caused a blackout to most of Bruce County and the southeastern part of Grey County for about an hour. With the power off for a number of hours or longer in many rural areas, hundreds of farmers had to milk their cows by hand, and, as their electric milk storage facilities were not operating and the milk could not be delivered to dairies due to the impassable roads, thousands of litres of milk had to be discarded. Even when the electricity was restored, with the impassable roads blocking delivery to users and their storage systems customarily only holding two-days' production, many farmers still needed to dump large quantities of milk. Snowmobiles were used to take hydro crews out to fix downed lines—some sources asserted that by the forenoon of January 27, only 800 homes across Southwestern Ontario were without electricity but other sources state "thousands were stranded for days ... without heat or hydro." At least 200 homes near Clinton were without power from near the start of the blizzard until January 28, at which time helicopters were used to airlift in repair crews. On January 28, the CAF used four helicopters and three Otter aircraft equipped with skiis to conduct an aerial search of the entire snowbound countryside north of London to ensure there were no people from stranded vehicles trapped or lost in the countryside; no such persons were found. There were reports of truckloads of chickens, turkeys and pigs being frozen to death because livestock transport trucks became marooned.

On January 28, snowmobilers rescued a couple near Port Elgin who had been without heat or hydro since January 26. On January 29, many towns and villages were still mostly isolated, with stores and factories still closed, and police were posted at their edges advising people it was unsafe to drive into the snow-drifted countryside. Snowmobile clubs in Hanover, Port Elgin, Southampton and other areas worked with the police 24-hours a day to aid in emergencies, including delivering food and fuel to isolated farms, transporting medical patients to medical facilities, and delivering medications. Snowmobilers also delivered food and blankets to various places where people were stranded. The continued high snow falls in northern areas, such as Paisley, meant even snowmobilers had difficulty making deliveries in the deep snow by January 30. "It was universally acknowledged that the local snowmobilers saved the day delivering almost whatever was needed to wherever people were stranded."

==== Students marooned and schools closed ====
About 20,000 students in the London/Lake Huron Region, mostly rural students who took buses to school, ended up being marooned at their schools or, if their school was in a town or city, billeted in nearby homes—sometimes friends or relatives, but often just volunteers—the night of Tuesday, January 26 and, in many cases, for one or two nights beyond that. (Note: Approximately the following number of students were not able to get home: Huron County—5,000 on January 26; and 4,200 on January 27 and 28, 2,500 billetted and 1,700 at schools; Perth County including Stratford—1,200 on January 26; and 700 on January 27; Oxford County including Woodstock—3,000 on January 26; Middlesex County including London—4,300 on January 26, 1,900 on January 27, and 75 on January 28; Waterloo County including Kitchener—3,700 on January 26; and 2,500 on January 27; Wellington County—1,000 on January 26; and, Bruce and Grey Counties—880 on January 26 and 27, and 530 on January 28. Smaller numbers in counties to south, including Elgin (400 students all of whom were home by January 28), Lambtom and Kent counties, and to the east, Brant County including Brantford (600 students), were also marooned. In the four-countries of Middlesex, Huron, Perth and Oxford, directly north of London, there were a total of 7,000 students billeted at homes and 5,000 staying at schools.) Weather forecasts had not predicted the strength or duration of winds in the Lake Huron Region, (Note: A heavy storm warning had been issued for areas near Georgian Bay further north and for Central and Northeastern Ontario at 8 p.m. the day before, and a wind and cold wave warning was issued for most of Southern Ontario, which includes the London/Lake Huron area, at 7 a.m. that day.) so school administrators were mostly taken by surprise, resulting in different school boards and individual schools taking different approaches. In the following days, the Goderich Signal Star stated "why were they [schools] not closed before or at noon on Tuesday?"

Some principals arranged for the school buses to come and take students home in the late-morning or early-afternoon, but in many cases, due to driving visibility soon dropping to only a few metres, the drivers had to abort the runs and return to the schools. In some cases, the buses got marooned on the way to or just outside the schools, while a small number of buses got marooned partway through their routes, forcing drivers and students to take refugee with farmers. In some cases, children walking to their buses were blown away by the ferocious winds, illustrating they should stay at the school. Some school boards held off buses for a few hours gambling that the blizzard conditions would weaken by mid- or late-afternoon, while at other schools, principals contemplated early dismissals but parents phoned saying it was too dangerous for that, so they waited hoping conditions would improve, but as that did not materialize, by mid- or late-afternoon plans for everyone to stay overnight were formulated. Bruce and Grey counties, which are closer to the Georgian Bay area covered by a storm warning and upon which the blizzard ascended later in the day, were able to get all but 880 students home that day.

In the towns and cities, it was often high school students who were stranded in-town; most were billeted with residents, with some being transferred from high schools to billets during the day January 27. In the Town of Clinton, population of about 3,000, 600 secondary school students were billeted in volunteer's homes. For pupils staying overnight at elementary schools in small settlements or on isolated rural roads, food was a substantial concern; in a separate school north of Lucan, the food supply was dangerously low for the 270 students by January 27, as the stores in the village ran out of milk and bread and almost all food—but snowmobile caravans delivered food from various sources to that school and many others, in addition to some farmers delivering eggs by tractor. The next day, the CAF, with heavy-duty trucks and a tracked armoured-personnel carrier, were able to forge through the drifts to replenish Lucan with supplies. At a school in the village of Brucefield, where 600 students and 24 teachers were marooned for 55 hours, soup, crackers and 20 cases of pop brought by snowmobile from two local stores, plus 160 loaves of bread from two bread trucks that were stranded in the village, became first few meals for the throng. Schools used drapes from windows or stages as blankets and gym mats, hall runners and carpeted floors as mattresses. Large numbers of blankets, loaned from hotels or hospitals or villagers, medical supplies or even doctors were delivered by snowmobile caravans or by CAF tracked-vehicles or helicopters.

By early January 28, the greatest obstacle to getting pupils home became snow-blocked roads, and achieving that goal often required detailed coordination, including students being delivered by buses as far as the roads were clear, such as to a specific store, and then being transported by snowmobiles to their actual homes on severely drifted concession roads. One school bus travelling to pick up students on January 28 crashed into an obscured car abandoned in the middle of the road. In some cases, CAF tracked-vehicles transported children to their homes. The morning of Friday, January 29, about 5,000 students in the Lake Huron Region were still stuck at their schools, but aside from a few isolated cases, all were transported to their homes before that night for the weekend despite the fact the second blizzard struck that day.

In rural parts of Perth, Huron, Bruce and Grey countries, schools remained closed until Tuesday, February 2 or Wednesday, February 3 due to impassable secondary roads blocking access to the schools and precluding school buses operating, while in the rural portions of Middlesex (outside of London) most reopened on Monday, February 1. In the towns and cities of those counties, schools were open by January 28 or 29 to in-town students who could walk to them. In the Kitchener and Brantford areas on the eastern edge of Southwestern Ontario, Waterloo County schools were closed until Monday, January 31 due to higher winds in Kitchener causing drifting snow on January 26, 28 and 29, whereas Brant County schools reopened January 28, despite the fact the area had substantially more snow on January 26–27.

==== London paralyzed ====
The snow in London was so deep by the end of the day on January 26, that arterial roads downtown and elsewhere were completely jammed with stuck cars, and when heavy machinery was called to move the cars, that machinery also got stuck. Four cars were found stuck on railways tracks so the railway had to be called to hold the trains. At 8 p.m., the visibility was so minimal there was such a strong danger of plows hitting marooned cars that London pulled the plows off the road. The Mayor of London declared a state of emergency, with the rationale that it allowed the CAF to provide assistance and the use of its vehicles. The CAF provided 180 personnel and 20 vehicles, including heavy duty trucks, four-wheeled drive jeeps, a three-ton ambulance, a 17-passenger tracked-vehicle and six tracked-army personnel carriers, most for their own usage in the entire Region, such as for transferring sick persons to medical facilities, but some for loan to the City of London. London police also used four-by-four vehicles loaned by citizens to get around, such as transporting those in medical need or searching marooned cars for occupants. Soon after the blizzard hit London, buses were pulled from the road as the snow was falling faster than plows could clear it. In downtown London, a two-horse open sleigh provided public transportation. London's buses were also unable to operate on January 27 but returned to full service on all but a few residential routes on January 28 as city plows worked all night January 27–28 to make most streets passable.

Even in the City, numerous factories had to find accommodation for workers who were unable to drive or take transit home on January 26 and most factories and businesses were completely shut down for two to three days. Classes at all universities and colleges in London were cancelled until the snow emergency was over. London's three radio stations gave non-stop reports of weather conditions and the situation around area for two to three days; they allowed phone calls on the air so people could communicate emergencies or other needs which other people in the area could often help solve. Due to the exceeding high volume of telephone calls because people throughout Southwestern Ontario were calling others to divulge their whereabouts, service the afternoon of January 26 in London, Brantford and other centres was on partial delay at times, meaning people heard a short dial tone and had to wait until later to attempt a phone call. London's Courts and City offices were closed for two days but were in operation on January 28.

=== Greater Toronto Area ===
The blizzard hit Toronto for two to three hours as the afternoon rush hours were commencing. While only between 4.6 and 9.1 centimetres (1.8 and 3.6 in) of snow fell between then and the next morning, the consistent winds of 50 km/h, gusting to 84 km/h, created areas in the central and northern Toronto with zero visibility while other areas had about 400 metres (0.25 mi) visibility. Hundreds of accidents occurred per hour for several hours, including numerous jack-knifed transport trucks, a 32-car pile-up, and several eight- or ten-car chain-reaction collisions, completely clogging the Don Valley Parkway, Highway 401 and the arterial roads.

A 19-vehicle collision started by a school bus hitting a transport truck, necessitated the closure of those freeways for two hours, partly to enable sanding and salting. Hundreds of drivers were trapped and many abandoned their cars in frustration or because they ran out of gas, so even after the freeways were reopened they were described by the OPP as "parking lots." One person was killed when hit by a car and 20 people suffered injuries, two severe, in various accidents, the total of which surpassed all previous storm events in Toronto. Buses were drastically slowed, resulting in several thousand subway riders having no buses to get on when disembarking the northern end of the Yonge Subway line—to avoid overloading the passenger platforms, subway trains holding over 1,000 people were paused from unloading. The second storm created poor driving conditions, including reduced visibility (to between 800 and 1,200 metres [0.50 and 0.75 mi]) for several hours again the evening of January 29 with snowfalls of between 6.6 and 9.8 centimetres (2.6 and 3.9 in), but accident numbers were not substantial.

=== Remainder of southern Ontario ===
Windsor, in the far end of Southwestern Ontario, only received 4.8 centimetres (1.9 in) of snow, but wind gusts up to 100 km/h (62 mph) meant it experienced near-blizzard conditions much of January 26 with two hours of blizzard conditions. Chatham to east of Windsor, had similar amount of snow, but the winds gusting to 112 km/h (70 mph) whipped snow into drifts, caused the suspension of all buses in the area, blew in some windows and blew down some electricity and telephone lines. The second storm dumped 10.4 centimetres (4.1 in) of snow on Windsor on January 29 and brought winds that created visibility as low as 800 metres (0.50 mi); results included at least 57 accidents in one day, numerous cars landing in highway ditches or being abandoned from being struck in snowbanks, plus 1,500 homes losing electricity.

The Hamilton area's highways and roads was significantly impacted by the blizzard on January 26 as, although the area received less snow (3.0 centimetres [1.2 in], it had only 200-metre (0.12 mi) visibility from early afternoon until evening. The remainder of the Niagara Peninsula was not hit as heavily by the blizzard, with St. Catharines and Welland receiving 10–11 centimetres (3.9–4.3 in) of snow, the bulk of it on January 27 when wind speeds were lower. Hamilton received a further 11.0 centimetres (4.3 in) of snow from the second storm system beginning late in the evening on January 29.

=== Central and eastern Ontario ===
In Central Ontario to the east of Georgian Bay, 15.2 centimetres (6.0 in) of snow was deposited on January 26 with a further 25.7 centimetres (10.1 in) dumped on January 28–29. Wind-driven snow kept snow plows off the roads for much of January 26 and 27 and Highway 400 was littered with hundreds of abandoned vehicles. A 20-car pile-up occurred on Highway 400 just south of Barrie which was formally closed soon after, as were most other highways in the area. Hundreds of students in Barrie and the surrounding Simcoe County were stranded at their schools overnight and the Governor-General of Canada was marooned in Orillia after his official train was snowbound in nearby Parry Sound.

In Eastern Ontario, an advance wave of the storm created near-blizzard conditions (400 metres [0.25 mi] visibility) in Ottawa the morning of the January 26, and then reduced visibility (800 to 1,600 metres [0.50 to 0.99 mi]) all day on January 27 with wind gusts as high as 95 km/h (59 mph); the city received 19.8 centimetres (7.8 in) of snow. Traffic on Ottawa's expressways slowed to a crawl at rush-hours on both days, with one expressway closed for six hours, and snow-blocked roads pre-empted school buses, leading to school closures in most rural areas across the district for up to three days. Highway 401 had numerous cars in its ditches and was closed for ten hours near Cornwall due to a multi-tractor trailer collision. Ottawa received 10.2 centimetres (4.0 in) more snow on January 29 and 30 with some strong winds but impacts were minimal as the strongest winds were overnight. Kingston which experienced some blowing snow and 6.9 centimetres (2.7 in) of snow over two days, escaped the worst of the first storm, although Picton to its west had higher levels of drifting snow, resulting in schools being closed for one day. From the late afternoon of January 29 to early morning of January 30, the second storm hit the Kingston area causing near-blizzard conditions (with two hours of blizzard conditions) and 9.7 centimetres (3.8 in) of snow, with drifts up to 1 metre (3.3 ft); on Highway 401 in Gananoque a 12-vehicle pile-up occurred.

== Ohio ==
=== Northeastern Ohio ===
The blizzard—that status verified by the National Weather Service (NWS)—enveloped northeastern Ohio beginning late morning January 26, with 2 inches (5.1 cm) of snowfall, on average—although some areas east of Cleveland received up to 12 inches (30 cm)—being blasted into cars' windshields by winds between 80 and 100 mph (130 and 160 km/h). There were several multi-car collisions including ones of 13 and 15 vehicles, and the American Automobile Association (AAA) reported close to 350 calls for assistance between the morning of January 26 and noon on January 27, some because clients' car batteries were dead because of the bitter cold or their cars stalled due to the high winds blowing their engine blocks full of snow. The speed limit on the Ohio Turnpike was lowered from 70 to 40 miles per hour (113 to 64 km/h) and trailers were banned. Two thousand people were stranded in Cleveland overnight due to the treacherous driving conditions. Schools were closed throughout the region for two days as was Kent State University.

In Cleveland, gale-force winds of close to 98 mph (158 km/h) caused widespread damage: windows were blasted out in several office buildings cutting a large number of people; 11 different parts of the area were left without power due to damaged power lines; and some construction equipment was blown over, blocking streets, and forcing the evacuation of an office skyscraper in case equipment from a neighboring skyscraper might be blown into that building. The high winds tossed people around, prompting many downtown to form human chains linked to light poles to prevent people from being thrown into automobile traffic; despite that dozens of people required hospital treatment from falls.

In Akron icy pavement—the extreme cold, prevented salt applied by road crews from melting any of the ice—and blowing snow caused numerous vehicle collisions and dozens of cars to slide into ditches, the result being massive traffic tie-ups which blocked all four expressways, plus several other major roads during the morning and afternoon rush hours. Police had to access the accident sites on the expressways by using motorcycles and entering via the wrong way using exit ramps. In all, 95 traffic accidents were investigated in Akron by police on January 26, although few happened in the evening as few motorists ventured onto the roads.

=== Southern Ohio ===
In the Cincinnati region, while there was minimal snow, winds gusting as high as 60 mph (97 km/h) made motorists hold their steering wheels tightly to resist winds directing their cars off the roads or into the paths of other vehicles. On Interstate 75 to the north, near Dayton a tractor trailer-rig was blown onto its side by a gust. The winds in Cincinnati also tossed garbage cans, knocked down wires and tree limbs, blew off portions of several roofs, levelled a partially built warehouse, blew permanent signs over, and shattered glass windows in at least seven businesses. The Ohio River had 6-foot (1.8 m) waves that ripped a barge loose and sank it. In Dayton, a roof was partially ripped off a new car dealership which then heavily damaged several cars on the lot.

== Pennsylvania ==
The blizzard—a status verified in Pennsylvania in the US Government's Weekly Weather Report—hit Pittsburgh around noon on January 26 with gale-force gusts of up to 67 mph (108 km/h), temperatures plummeting to about 15 °F (−9 °C), and a 4-inch (10 cm) deposit of snow. The winds tore off part of a factory roof, blew a tennis bubble down, and broke windows of several commercial buildings, as well as knocking down trees and breaking tree limbs, with the winds and falling trees knocking down power lines, thereby causing electricity outages in virtually every community in the Pittsburgh District. Debris was blown off an under-construction downtown office tower, hitting at least one person, therefore, warranting the closure of the below streets for about five hours. In total, ten people were treated for injuries from flying articles in Pittsburgh. The wind-driven snow and icy road conditions caused numerous accidents, prompting state and city road crews to work overnight to apply cinders and salt to reduce the slipperiness of the roads. The Western Pennsylvania AAA chapter reported upwards of 2,000 calls for service on January 27, the bulk due to cars not starting from the bitter cold and, for cars parked outside, the winds blowing snow into the engine blocks chilling the engine even further.

In the City of Erie and six adjacent rural counties comprising most of northwestern Pennsylvania, schools were closed for two days. Erie only received 1.4 inches (3.6 cm) of snow on January 26, but received 8.9 inches (23 cm) more on January 28 and 29 when the second storm system moved through. On January 26 and part of January 27, Interstate 90 was closed for its entire length of northwestern Pennsylvania and Interstate 79 connecting Erie to Pittsburgh, while not closed, had complete whiteout conditions and numerous vehicles marooned along its length. There were two fatalities in Pennsylvania from the first blizzard, one a person trapped in her car in a snow drift for over 15 hours, who died from carbon monoxide poisoning, and another from a head-on car collision. The second storm most impacted western Pennsylvania the afternoon and evening of January 29, causing icy roads which resulted in crawling traffic and numerous skidding accidents, including two in the Pittsburgh area which caused single fatalities.

== Central Appalachians and Central Atlantic Coast ==
=== West Virginia and Virginia ===
In West Virginia, while there was minimal snow, winds of 70 mph (110 km/h) blew away roofs on January 26, including at an engineering building at the West Virginia University in Morgantown, and blew out numerous windows and took down trees and power lines in several different areas of the state. In parts of Virginia, winds gusted to 67 mph (108 km/h) blowing in windows, tearing down power lines, and uprooting trees or breaking off limbs, which then caused numerous temporary highway closures. One trailer with people inside was overturned and slammed down on a road but no serious injuries resulted.

=== Maryland and Washington D.C. ===
The storm lashed Maryland commencing the afternoon of January 26, bringing rain and hail plus gales as high as 73 mph (117 km/h), which blew over countless trees, lifted the roof off one house, blew the walls out of an apartment unit leaving the roof to mostly collapse, blew a 350-ton construction crane into Baltimore harbour, and overturned a house trailer, although no serious injuries resulted. Power lines were also blown down or knocked down by falling trees or branches leaving almost 40,000 customers without power for a time. A tornado warning was issued the Baltimore area for two hours but no actual funnel clouds were observed.

In Washington D.C., gales of 78 mph (126 km/h) blew parts of the roofs of two apartment buildings off, downed power lines down and uprooted trees, including one which demolished a car being driven on the Rock Creek Parkway—the driver only suffered minor injuries. The storm also brought hail—which was golf-balled sized in the nearby city of Laurel—rain and snow, interspersed with sunshine, and punctuated with occasional thunder and lightning, a rare winter occurrence caused by the brisk movement of the storm.

=== North Carolina ===
In North Carolina, high winds blew in windows, tore down power lines, and uprooted trees or break off limbs, which then caused numerous temporary highway closures. One trailer with people inside was overturned and slammed down on a road but no serious injuries resulted. A 120 mph (190 km/h) gust tore the specially-constructed roof off of the visitor center at Grandfather Mountain State Park.

== New York ==
=== Western New York and central New York ===
Blizzard conditions enveloped most of New York State (N.Y.) west of Utica for up to 29 consecutive hours before the NWS declared the blizzard over at 9 p.m. on January 27. Unusual for a blizzard, thunder and lightning accompanied the wind and snow across the state with a lightning strike of a transmission cable taking a Syracuse television station off the air. While new snowfall amounts were minimal in some areas—Buffalo only received 2.2 inches (5.6 cm) on January 26 and 27 combined—continual 70 mph (110 km/h) winds drove snow into the windshields of cars, reducing visibility to zero, and into 8-foot (2.4 m) snow drifts which most snow plows were powerless to clear on their own. Hundreds of minor accidents occurred—so many that police could not investigate them all—including a fifteen car pile-up near Scottsville. The extremely poor road conditions, plus additional hazards such as downed power lines and tree branches and non-operational traffic signals, prompted authorities from 11 countries to ban all traffic, excepting emergency vehicles, from all roads.

The New York State Police closed the 60-mile (97 km) section of the New York Thruway between Erie, Pennsylvania and Buffalo from midday January 26 to early the morning of January 27. Soon after that closure, there was an 18-vehicle collision further east on the Thruway, near Batavia. The NY State Police immediately closed the Thruway's 260-mile (416 km) section from Buffalo through Rochester to Schenectady, near Albany, from 4:15 p.m. on January 26, a closure which remained in effect 47 hours until almost 4 p.m. on January 28. Thousands of travellers, including families, long-distance truck drivers and other motorists, were forced to seek refuge in hotels, Thruway rest centers, private homes, and other make-shift accommodation, such as fire halls in Batavia, most for two nights and two days. In Warsaw hundreds of marooned people were put up in private homes, the community hospital, the village firehall, the county courthouse and the village bomb shelter. The Warsaw hospital was especially full as 100 staff who were unable to travel home stayed overnight. At one point, power was cut off to 2,000 homes in the Warsaw area.

Numerous towns and cities over huge area of central and western N.Y. were completely isolated for two days or more. Most airports cancelled most of their flights due to ice and snow shutting down the runways. In western New York, with all roads impassable, 200 private snowmobilers in Wyoming County organized into patrols to search all the marooned vehicles in the county's 16 townships to ensure there were no stranded motorists, and to perform other emergency functions, such as delivering a furnace repair man or delivering drugs. The patrols found approximately 100 abandoned cars but none had any occupants remaining. In the Buffalo area, where the winds gusted to 80 mph (130 km/h), the State Police withdrew their patrols (aside from emergencies) for a period and numerous schools and businesses were closed. In central New York, schools in Syracuse were closed for January 27 and 28 during which 10 inches (25 cm) of snow was received (Syracuse received 13.1 inches [33 cm] for the entire five-day period). The Ithaca area to the south had 50 to 75 mph (80 to 121 km/h) winds producing blizzard conditions from 10 p.m. on January 26 to 7 a.m. on January 27 facilitating the closure of schools both days and, while roads were open, conditions were extremely hazardous with about 25 collisions occurring, including a six-car pile-up. The winds caused an electrical outage that left 115 miners in a Livingston County salt mine in the dark for 90 minutes.

After a calm the afternoon of January 28, the second snowstorm dropped 6.0 more inches (15 cm) of snow on Buffalo over three days ending January 30, while Oswego on the southern shore of Lake Ontario in Central New York, received 15.7 inches (40 cm) of snow from late January 28 until January 30, on top of 6.4 inches (16 cm) it received on January 26–27. The N.Y. State Police re-closed the entire Thruway again in the early morning hours of January 29, although it was operational again by that afternoon. Outside of Rochester and the Finger Lakes area (see next section), there were two fatalities from traffic accidents related to the blizzards in NY State, one a car-snow plow crash north of Albany on January 27 and the other a car skidding off a road near a bridge near Binghamton on January 30, while a third person died on Long Island from slipping into icy water on January 28. Long Island and New York City received a dusting of snow with bitter cold and winds from the first blizzard, which created ice that created moderate traffic and transit tie-ups.

=== Rochester and the Finger Lakes region ===
In the Finger Lakes Region to the southeast of Rochester, (Note: Greater Rochester is considered part of the Finger Lakes Region which is located between the formally defined western New York and central New York Regions; the region is, geographically, west-central New York) just before noon on January 26, the sky suddenly grew dark and then driving snow came along with thunder and lightning, "thus harkening in the 'Blizzard of '71', which would rage almost three days." As the winds grew faster and visibility markedly declined, schools closed early so buses could transport the students home safely. That night, even higher velocity winds tore siding off barns and the roofs off smaller buildings, and in the morning, amidst swirling snow, Yates County closed all roads and schools until further notice, just as ten other adjacent counties were doing. In Ontario County, closer to Rochester, most law enforcement staff switched to snowmobiles instead of patrol cars, one task being to deliver gas to snow plows which had run out of fuel. One road in that county had 50 cars stuck along a section with particularly high snow drifts but many tow truck drivers, fearing for their own safety, refused to go into the blinding snow to remove stalled or abandoned cars that were blocking roads, thereby hindering plowing. In the village of Hilton, northwest of Rochester, a doctor rode a snowmobile from the volunteer fire department to deliver a baby.

Rochester was especially struck hard by the blizzard, receiving 6.9 inches (18 cm) of snow over two days, snow which was blown into drifts several feet high. Greater Rochester was virtually snowbound and brought to a complete standstill with all schools, stores (including department stores), factories (including Xerox, which employed 12,000), offices, banks and government offices closed by early afternoon on January 26 and remaining closed on January 27. Thousands of school children and workers in the area were unable to travel home and were stranded in motels, emergency shelters and friends' homes. In addition, thousands of homes in the area lost electricity due to falling trees and limbs knocking down electricity transmission infrastructure. Bus service in and around Rochester was severely limited by the blizzard, with regional buses only getting back on schedule the early afternoon of January 27 and intercity buses resuming their routes on January 28. All flights were cancelled for much of January 26 and 27 and Rochester-Monroe County airport even officially closed for 10 hours. Two radio stations within the Region were knocked off the air. Many tow trucks refused to go into the blinding snow to remove stalled or abandoned cars that were blocking roads, in some cases hindering plowing.

The morning of January 28, three-quarters of roads in Monroe County, which contains Rochester, were still impassable and most expressways or highways were open but with "extremely limited visibility". Then, the evening of January 28, the second storm arrived from Ontario and Michigan returning full blizzard conditions, including winds of 33 mph (53 km/h) and a further 10.0 inches (25 cm) of snow over three days, to Rochester and the surrounding area. Several highways and many suburban roads around Rochester were closed again. The Automobile Club of Rochester reported a record number of service calls between early evening January 28 and mid-day January 29, the fourth day of the blizzards, and flights at Rochester-Monroe County Airport were cancelled once more after having just returned to normal the morning of January 28. The five-days of blizzard-like conditions brought about seven fatalities in west-central New York: one Rochester-area person was found dead in their car which was buried in snow after apparently suffering a heart attack; another suffered a heart attack while skidding into another car; a third was killed in a car-school bus collision in Yates County, which also injured 12 other passengers; and, on January 29, four Rochester-area men died of heart attacks while shovelling their driveways of snow from the second blizzard.

== Quebec ==
=== Greater Montreal area ===
A leading edge of the first blizzard moved into Montreal mid-afternoon on January 26 briefly creating near-blizzard conditions, while dropping alternating periods of rain and snow, and then deposited 15.8 centimetres (6.2 in) of snow by the evening of January 27. Most dangerous was the consistent 40 to 50 km/h (25 to 31 mph) wind—with gusts of up to 100 km/h (62 mph)—which created white-out conditions (visibility 0 to 400 metres [0.00 to 0.25 mi]) for most of 16 consecutive hours from 1 a.m. to 5 p.m on January 27. With the arrival of the blizzard, the temperatures decreased rapidly from +2 °C (36 °F) at 3 p.m. to −20 °C (−4 °F), with a wind chill of −34 °C (−29 °F), overnight, although at peak wind gusts, the wind chill was −55 °C (−67 °F). Four Montrealers died from the blizzard, two pedestrians who suffered heart attacks on city streets and sidewalks, which were treacherous for walking due to ice and wind, a third who suffered a heart attack while driving, and a fourth who slipped under a commuter train which was leaving a station.

As it had rained shortly before, highways and streets were frozen into sheets of ice by the bitter cold. Accidents in the hundreds, including one of 18 vehicles, plagued the city's streets and expressways, as drivers were blinded by wind-driven snow and hampered by ice hidden under a thin layer of snow, with occasional knee-high snow drifts. Drivers were stuck on many city streets and expressways and abandoned their vehicles, clogging many of them—the downtown Bonaventure Expressway was closed until 1 p.m. on January 27—and Highway 3 on South Shore of the St. Lawrence River was so hazardous that motorists had to drive at 3 km/h (1.9 mph) and once they encountered one of the many pile-ups on it, abandoned their vehicles. Freeway and highway traffic leaving the city was immobilized. The morning of January 27, police requested that residents use public transportation, such as the city's two subway lines, which experienced a 25% rise in ridership, but streets were still littered with abandoned cars, although traffic moved much better that afternoon rush-hour than it had the previous evening or that morning.

Many flights were cancelled at Montreal's airport for the 24-hours of the blizzard as the combination of icy runways, frigid temperatures and driving snow made the work of ground maintenance crews nearly impossible. Most intercity bus service was cancelled for day and a half while intercity trains were 30 minutes late for nearby destinations, but 7 1/2 hours late for those coming through Ontario. The Port of Montreal did not operate on January 27 and banks, stores, restaurants and theatres reported minimal business. Most workers were able to get home the evening of January 27 as local buses and commuter rail were beginning to function regularly again, so downtown hotels did not report many check-ins due to the blizzard. All schools in Montreal and the surrounding areas were closed for January 27 and several areas in the city proper had power blackouts. The fierce stormstorm that hit southwestern Ontario and west-central New York on January 29, affected Montreal for half a day beginning after midnight on January 30, producing moderate winds, 10.7 centimetres (4.2 in) of snow, and visibility as low as 600 metres (0.37 mi)distance for certain times; several roads and highways on Montreal's South Shore were closed for a few hours due to drifts and scores of multiple-vehicle traffic collisions; flights were also cancelled that morning.

=== Southeastern Quebec and Quebec City ===
The Eastern Townships southeast of Montreal had so many accidents being reported that it took at least three hours for police to arrive at most of them. The Trans-Canada Highway had a pile-up involving four transport trucks east of Montreal and, near Drummonville, 60 motorists were stranded in their cars due to blinding conditions and blocked exits—snow clearing equipment had been unable to get through the exits, with some equipment breaking down in the high drifts. The area received 15 centimetres (5.9 in) of snow and experienced near-blizzard conditions (visibility 800 m to 1 km) for most of December 27.

Quebec City was especially hard hit by the blizzard, receiving 27.2 centimetres (10.7 in) of snow, 15.5 centimetres (6.1 in) of that on January 27, with consistent winds of 48 km/h (30 mph), gusting to 72 km/h (45 mph), which created close to white-out conditions (visibility between 400 and 800 metres [0.25 and 0.50 mi]) for 10 hours ending mid-afternoon on January 27. The conditions brought traffic in and near Quebec City to a standstill and all schools in the region were closed on January 27. Ferry service across the St. Lawrence River was suspended, Quebec City's airport was closed, and all highways across the province were closed by the blizzard, even the three tolled freeways. In addition to the four fatalities in Montreal, two other deaths occurred in Quebec—one person hit by a car 65 km (40 miles) northeast of Quebec City, and another person on a motorcycle was struck by a car in northern Quebec. On January 30, the second storm hit Quebec City with 25.9 centimetres (10.2 in) more snow and near-blizzard conditions (visibility ranging from 400 to 1,200 metres [0.25 to 0.75 mi]) for 11 hours.

== New England ==
The blizzard rampaged into New England on January 27 creating whiteout conditions in large parts of New Hampshire and Vermont, with near blizzard conditions in northern Connecticut and most of Maine. The NWS declared it the first 'true' blizzard to hit Vermont in many years and stated the wind chill factor was between -40 and −50F (-40 to −46C). Vermont received between 5 and 24 inches (13 and 61 cm) of snow, with the highest amounts in the north—most schools in central and northern Vermont were closed by midday on January 27 and remained closed on January 28. Burlington received 6.2 inches (16 cm) and stopped plowing its city streets as plows could not keep up with the blowing and drifting snow. The state also stopped plowing its highways, and the speed limit on Interstate Highways in Vermont was reduced to 40 mph (64 km/h) because of the poor driving conditions, but intercity buses were only delayed by about 30 minutes. In Massachusetts, the morning of January 27 had cold winds, blowing snow, near-zero visibility and highways glazed with inch-thick ice which resulted in hundreds of collisions and stranded cars "in piles" on expressways in Boston.

Winds from the storm died down somewhat by the time it reached Maine, sparing the state actual blizzard conditions, but the combination of winds, the high tide subsiding, and coastal sea-ice breaking up, destroyed 85% of the pier of the Portland Yacht Club and a quarter or more of several other piers in the area. Bangor, Maine received only 0.8 inch of snow but like the rest of New England, the temperature plummeted, in that city to −23.7 °F (−30.9 °C).

== Maritime Canada ==
The storm's strength dissipated more by the time it reach southern New Brunswick and later Nova Scotia, in Canada. Saint John, the most impacted city in New Brunswick, had brief snow squalls with 6.6 centimetres (2.6 in) of snow on the evening of January 27 along with brief winds gusts as high as 101 km/h (63 mph) and the temperature dropped to −16.7 °C (1.9 °F) by the morning of January 28. Halifax, Nova Scotia had 8.1 centimetres (3.2 in) of snow the night of January 27 with the temperature plummeting to −16.7 °C (1.9 °F) at dawn the next morning.

== See also ==
- Great Snowstorm of 1944
- Blizzard of 1977
- Great Blizzard of 1978
