= Great Blizzard of 1978 =

Historically strong winter storm across central and eastern USA in 1978

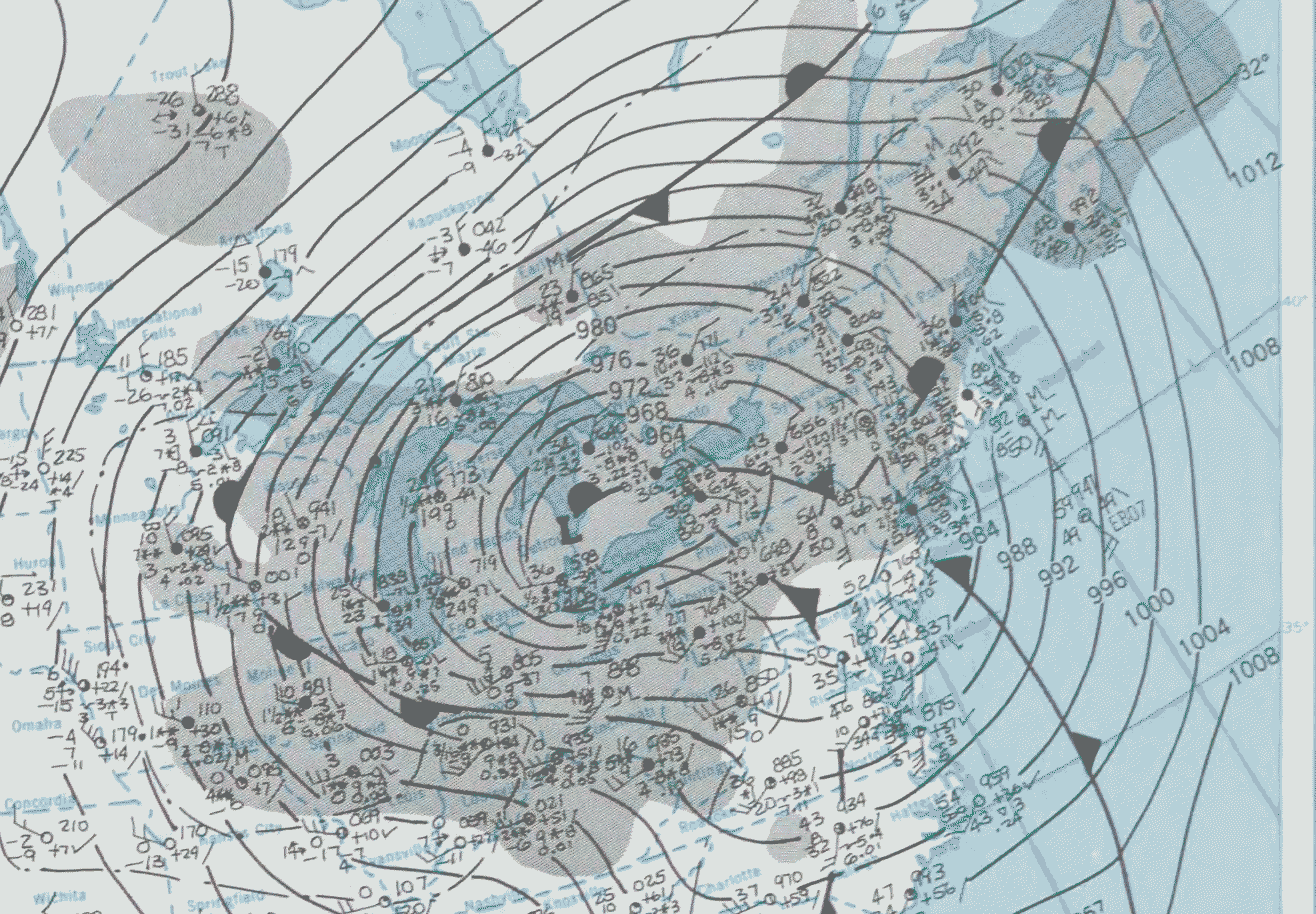
- Surface map on the morning of January 26, 1978

Meteorological history
- Formed: January 24, 1978
- Dissipated: January 29, 1978

Category 5 "Extreme" blizzard
- Regional snowfall index: 39.07 (NOAA)
- Highest winds: 111 mph (179 km/h)
- Lowest pressure: 955.5 mbar (hPa); 28.22 inHg
- Maximum snowfall or ice accretion: 52 in (130 cm) at Muskegon, Michigan

Overall effects
- Fatalities: ~90
- Damage: $100 million (1978 USD)
- Areas affected: Central United States, Eastern United States, Eastern Canada
- Part of the 1977–78 North American winter

The Great Blizzard of 1978, also known as the Cleveland Superbomb, was a historic winter storm that struck the Ohio Valley and Great Lakes regions of the United States as well as Southern Ontario in Canada from Wednesday, January 25 through Friday, January 27, 1978. It is often cited as one of the most severe blizzards in US history. The third lowest non-tropical atmospheric pressure ever recorded in the mainland United States occurred as the storm passed over Mount Clemens, Michigan, where barometer readings fell to 956.0 mb (28.23 inHg) on January 26.

== Meteorological synopsis ==
Late on Tuesday, January 24, 1978, surface maps revealed a moisture-laden Gulf low-pressure system developing over the southern United States, while a separate and unrelated low-pressure system was present over the Upper Midwest. A powerful Arctic jet stream (containing a wind max of 110 knots) surged straight south through the Northern Great Plains while a powerful subtropical jet (containing a wind max of 130 knots) moved south through Arizona, both during the time a huge upper ridge of high pressure forced the Pacific jet north into Northern Canada. These Arctic and subtropical jet streams merged (with maximum winds of 150 knots) which led the deepening Gulf low-pressure system, which had moved over Alabama and Georgia, to undergo explosive cyclogenesis and move rapidly northward towards West Virginia during the evening of January 25 (when record low pressures were logged across parts of the South and Mid-Atlantic). To be classified as undergoing explosive cyclogenesis, a storm's central pressure must drop at least 24 millibars, or an average of 1 millibar per hour, over a 24-hour period; the Great Blizzard dropped by a remarkable 40 millibars in that 24 hours.

The storm initially began as rain, but quickly changed to heavy snow during the predawn hours (as Arctic air deepened ahead of the storm), leading to frequent whiteouts and zero visibility during the day on January 26. As the storm headed for Ohio, it was "of unprecedented magnitude", according to the National Weather Service, which categorized it as a rare severe blizzard, the severest grade of winter storm. Particularly hard hit were Illinois, Indiana, Kentucky, Michigan, Ohio, and southeastern Wisconsin. Muskegon, Michigan, had up to 52 inches of snow in four days due to heavy lake-effect snow squalls after the blizzard began. Winds gusting up to 111 miles per hour (179 km/h) caused drifts that nearly buried some homes. Wind chill values reached −60 °F (−51 °C) across much of Ohio, where 51 of the at least 90 storm-related deaths occurred.

In Canada, the storm caused blizzard conditions across southwestern Ontario. In London, Ontario, 41 centimetres (16 in) of snow fell; the maximum wind-speed was 128 kilometres per hour (80 mph).

== Barometric pressure ==
On January 26, the third-lowest atmospheric pressure recorded in the mainland United States, apart from a tropical system, occurred as the storm passed over Mount Clemens, Michigan. There, barometer readings fell to 956.0 mb (28.23 inHg). In Detroit, air pressure fell to 28.34 inches of mercury (960 mbar). At around the same time, the absolute low pressure was measured at Sarnia, in Southwestern Ontario, Canada, where barometer readings decreased to 955.5 mb (28.22 inHg). Toronto pressure fell to 28.40 inches, breaking its record by 0.17.

The 956.0 mb (28.23 inHg) barometric pressure measurement recorded in Mount Clemens, Michigan, was the third-lowest non-tropical atmospheric pressure recorded in the mainland United States and the lowest in the Central United States. The lowest confirmed pressure for a non-tropical system in the continental United States had been set by a January 1913 Atlantic coast storm. The lowest central pressure for the 1978 blizzard was 955.5 mb (28.22 inHg) measured in Sarnia, Ontario. On rare occasions, extra-tropical cyclones with central pressures below 28 inches of mercury or about 95 kPa (950 mb) have been recorded in Wiscasset, Maine (27.9") and Newfoundland (27.76"). In addition, the blizzard is the highest-ranking winter storm on the Regional Snowfall Index, with a maximum value of 39.07, and one of only 26 storms to reach Category 5 on the scale.

== Impact ==
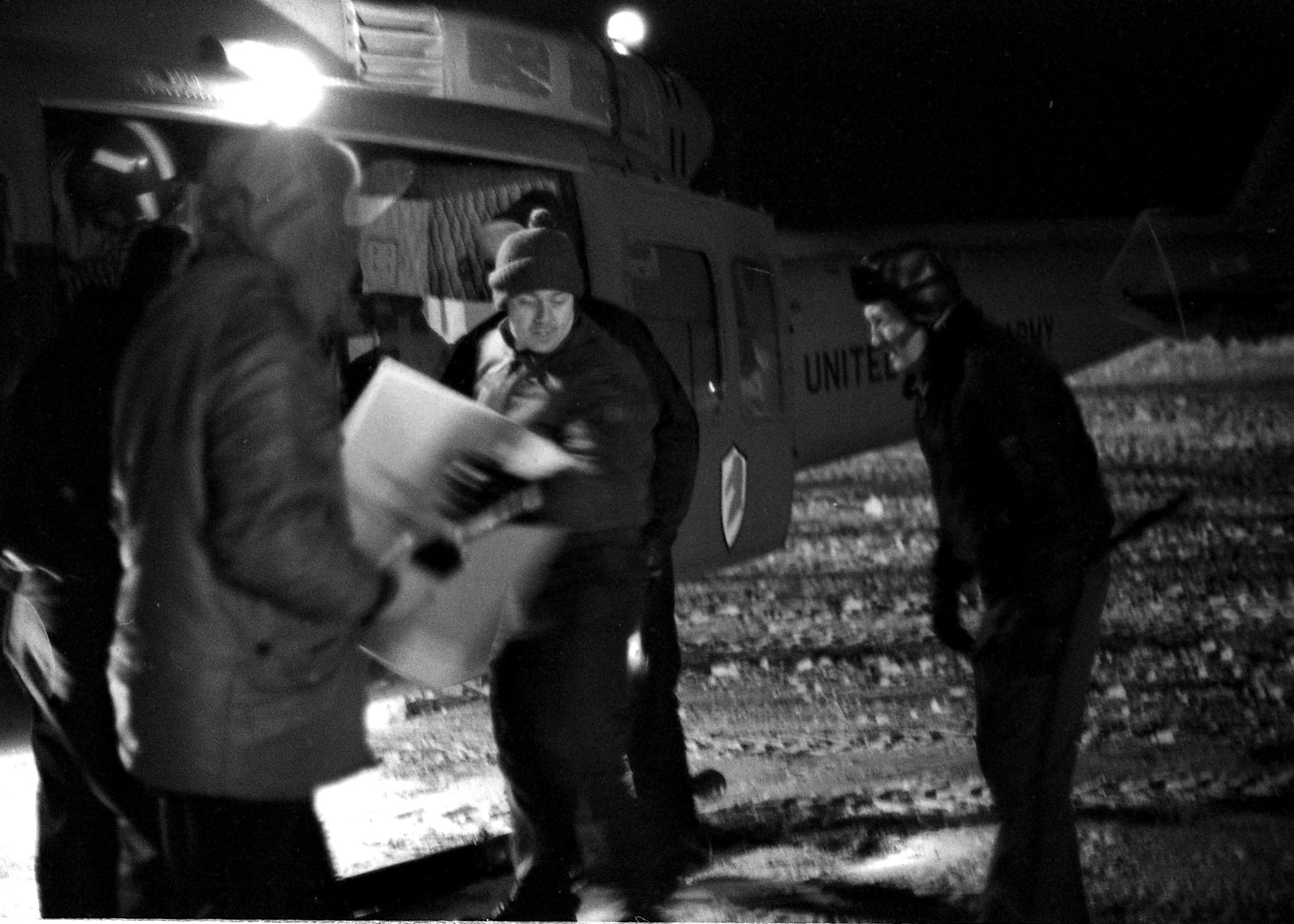
The Ohio National Guard unloading supplies from a UH-1 Iroquois helicopter during the blizzard

The blizzard was the worst in Ohio history; 51 people died as a result of the storm. Over 5,000 members of the Ohio National Guard were called in to make numerous rescues. Police asked citizens with four-wheel-drive vehicles or snowmobiles to transport doctors and nurses to the hospital. From January 26 to 27, the entire Ohio Turnpike was shut down for the first time ever. The total effect on transportation in Ohio was described by Major General James C. Clem of the Ohio National Guard as comparable to a nuclear attack.

Michigan Governor William Milliken declared a state of emergency and called out the Michigan National Guard to aid stranded motorists and road crews. The Michigan State Police pronounced Traverse City, Michigan, "unofficially closed" and warned area residents to stay home. WTCM radio staffer Marty Spaulding, who closed the bayfront location station the previous night at 11 pm, was called to reopen it the next day at 6 am as regular staffers could not get there due to impassable roads. Upon arriving after a 45-minute walk in waist-deep snow from his home 10 city blocks away, he had to dig down "a foot" to put the key in the front door.

In Indiana on day two, half an hour after the front passed through the area, the Indianapolis International Airport was closed due to whiteout conditions. At 3 am, the blizzard produced peak winds of 55 miles per hour (89 km/h). Temperatures dropped to 0 °F (−18 °C) that morning. Wind chills remained at −40 to −50 °F (−40 to −46 °C) nearly all day. Governor Otis Bowen declared a snow emergency for the entire state the morning of the 26th. Snow drifts of 10 to 20 feet (3.0 to 6.1 m) made travel virtually impossible, stranding an Amtrak train and thousands of vehicles and travelers. During the afternoon of the 26th, the Indiana State Police considered all Indiana roads closed.

Classes at Ohio State University in Columbus, Ohio, and the University of Notre Dame in Notre Dame, Indiana, were canceled for the first time in the history of those universities; at Purdue University in West Lafayette, Indiana, where 25 inches (64 cm) of snow fell, for the third time in its history; and, at Miami University in Oxford, Ohio, for the first time since the assassination of President John F. Kennedy. An inch (2.5 cm) or more, usually much more, of snow remained on much of that area for nearly two months. In Indiana, schools were closed for as much as three weeks, and the historic Indiana High School Boys Basketball Tournament was postponed for 17 days. The storm did much damage to the Ohio Valley and the Great Lakes.

Northwest of Toronto in Brampton, Ontario, on Thursday afternoon, school buses could not get through deep snow to the then-rural campus of Sheridan College to take students home. Neither could any other vehicles, so some community college students had to stay on campus overnight.

== Quotes ==
C. R. Snider, National Weather Service Meteorologist in Ann Arbor, Michigan, said on January 30, 1978:

The most extensive and very nearly the most severe blizzard in Michigan history raged January 26, 1978 and into part of Friday January 27. About 20 people died as a direct or indirect result of the storm, most due to heart attacks or traffic accidents. At least one person died of exposure in a stranded automobile. Many were hospitalized for exposure, mostly from homes that lost power and heat. About 100,000 cars were abandoned on Michigan highways, most of them in the southeast part of the state.

== Snowfall totals ==
The following table displays selected U.S. snowfall totals during January 25–29, 1978:

State	City/location	Amount (inches)	Amount (mm)
OH	Dayton	*12.2	*310
MI	Detroit	8.2	208
OH	Toledo	13.3	723.6
MI	Flint	9.9	251
MI	Grand Rapids	19.2	488
MI	Houghton Lake	*15.4	*391
IN	Indianapolis	*15.5	*394
IN	South Bend	41	1,041.4
MI	Lansing	19.3	490
MI	Muskegon	52	1,320.8
MI	Traverse City	22–28	559–711
IL	Chicago	12–13	305-330

Note: * = Total data for a 24-hour period.

== Lake Ontario and Lake Erie snow belts ==
The combination of persistent lake effect and cyclonic snowfalls in January 1978 resulted in several all-time monthly record snowfall totals to the lee shores of the lower Great Lakes. The cooperative observer station at the Bennetts Bridge power plant, near Altmar, New York, established an official all-time New York State monthly snowfall record with 192 inches (16.0 ft; 4.9 m) of snowfall in January 1978.

Long-term New York weather stations that established all-time monthly snowfall records in January 1978 include:

Station	Snowfall
Bennetts Bridge (Orwell)	192 inches (16.0 ft; 4.9 m)
Hooker 4 N (Montague)	182 inches (15.2 ft; 4.6 m)
Boonville 2 SSW	156.4 inches (13.03 ft; 3.97 m)
Old Forge	133.8 inches (11.15 ft; 3.40 m)
Oswego	120.3 inches (10.03 ft; 3.06 m)
Colden 1 N	108.9 inches (9.08 ft; 2.77 m)
Arcade	80.3 inches (6.69 ft; 2.04 m)
Lyons Falls	76.5 inches (6.38 ft; 1.94 m)

== See also ==
- Great Snowstorm of 1944
- 1971 Great Lakes blizzard
- Blizzard of 1977
